

522001–522100 

|-bgcolor=#E9E9E9
| 522001 ||  || — || May 25, 2010 || WISE || WISE ||  || align=right | 3.1 km || 
|-id=002 bgcolor=#d6d6d6
| 522002 ||  || — || January 3, 2011 || Mount Lemmon || Mount Lemmon Survey ||  || align=right | 2.5 km || 
|-id=003 bgcolor=#d6d6d6
| 522003 ||  || — || December 2, 2010 || Mount Lemmon || Mount Lemmon Survey || NAE || align=right | 2.2 km || 
|-id=004 bgcolor=#d6d6d6
| 522004 ||  || — || December 27, 2006 || Mount Lemmon || Mount Lemmon Survey ||  || align=right | 1.9 km || 
|-id=005 bgcolor=#E9E9E9
| 522005 ||  || — || August 30, 2005 || Kitt Peak || Spacewatch ||  || align=right | 2.0 km || 
|-id=006 bgcolor=#E9E9E9
| 522006 ||  || — || August 19, 2006 || Kitt Peak || Spacewatch ||  || align=right | 1.4 km || 
|-id=007 bgcolor=#d6d6d6
| 522007 ||  || — || September 27, 2009 || Mount Lemmon || Mount Lemmon Survey ||  || align=right | 2.5 km || 
|-id=008 bgcolor=#E9E9E9
| 522008 ||  || — || September 30, 2010 || Mount Lemmon || Mount Lemmon Survey ||  || align=right | 1.8 km || 
|-id=009 bgcolor=#d6d6d6
| 522009 ||  || — || March 23, 2012 || Catalina || CSS ||  || align=right | 3.7 km || 
|-id=010 bgcolor=#d6d6d6
| 522010 ||  || — || October 24, 2015 || Mount Lemmon || Mount Lemmon Survey ||  || align=right | 2.8 km || 
|-id=011 bgcolor=#d6d6d6
| 522011 ||  || — || December 18, 2004 || Mount Lemmon || Mount Lemmon Survey ||  || align=right | 3.2 km || 
|-id=012 bgcolor=#d6d6d6
| 522012 ||  || — || October 24, 2009 || Kitt Peak || Spacewatch ||  || align=right | 2.6 km || 
|-id=013 bgcolor=#d6d6d6
| 522013 ||  || — || August 28, 2014 || Haleakala || Pan-STARRS ||  || align=right | 2.7 km || 
|-id=014 bgcolor=#d6d6d6
| 522014 ||  || — || December 28, 2005 || Mount Lemmon || Mount Lemmon Survey ||  || align=right | 3.0 km || 
|-id=015 bgcolor=#d6d6d6
| 522015 ||  || — || October 30, 2005 || Mount Lemmon || Mount Lemmon Survey ||  || align=right | 2.5 km || 
|-id=016 bgcolor=#d6d6d6
| 522016 ||  || — || November 3, 2004 || Kitt Peak || Spacewatch ||  || align=right | 2.4 km || 
|-id=017 bgcolor=#d6d6d6
| 522017 ||  || — || August 20, 2014 || Haleakala || Pan-STARRS || 7:4 || align=right | 2.8 km || 
|-id=018 bgcolor=#d6d6d6
| 522018 ||  || — || August 30, 2014 || Mount Lemmon || Mount Lemmon Survey ||  || align=right | 2.7 km || 
|-id=019 bgcolor=#d6d6d6
| 522019 ||  || — || November 25, 2005 || Kitt Peak || Spacewatch ||  || align=right | 2.1 km || 
|-id=020 bgcolor=#d6d6d6
| 522020 ||  || — || March 15, 2012 || Mount Lemmon || Mount Lemmon Survey ||  || align=right | 2.7 km || 
|-id=021 bgcolor=#E9E9E9
| 522021 ||  || — || May 13, 2009 || Kitt Peak || Spacewatch ||  || align=right | 2.8 km || 
|-id=022 bgcolor=#E9E9E9
| 522022 ||  || — || December 22, 2003 || Kitt Peak || Spacewatch ||  || align=right data-sort-value="0.85" | 850 m || 
|-id=023 bgcolor=#d6d6d6
| 522023 ||  || — || February 20, 2012 || Haleakala || Pan-STARRS ||  || align=right | 2.3 km || 
|-id=024 bgcolor=#d6d6d6
| 522024 ||  || — || April 22, 2012 || Kitt Peak || Spacewatch ||  || align=right | 2.5 km || 
|-id=025 bgcolor=#d6d6d6
| 522025 ||  || — || August 29, 2014 || Mount Lemmon || Mount Lemmon Survey ||  || align=right | 2.4 km || 
|-id=026 bgcolor=#E9E9E9
| 522026 ||  || — || February 10, 2008 || Catalina || CSS ||  || align=right | 1.2 km || 
|-id=027 bgcolor=#E9E9E9
| 522027 ||  || — || December 29, 2011 || Mount Lemmon || Mount Lemmon Survey ||  || align=right | 1.2 km || 
|-id=028 bgcolor=#d6d6d6
| 522028 ||  || — || April 28, 2007 || Kitt Peak || Spacewatch ||  || align=right | 2.8 km || 
|-id=029 bgcolor=#E9E9E9
| 522029 ||  || — || March 8, 2008 || Catalina || CSS ||  || align=right | 1.5 km || 
|-id=030 bgcolor=#E9E9E9
| 522030 ||  || — || September 30, 2006 || Kitt Peak || Spacewatch ||  || align=right | 2.7 km || 
|-id=031 bgcolor=#d6d6d6
| 522031 ||  || — || February 10, 2011 || Catalina || CSS ||  || align=right | 3.5 km || 
|-id=032 bgcolor=#d6d6d6
| 522032 ||  || — || August 27, 2014 || Haleakala || Pan-STARRS ||  || align=right | 2.8 km || 
|-id=033 bgcolor=#d6d6d6
| 522033 ||  || — || January 13, 2011 || Mount Lemmon || Mount Lemmon Survey ||  || align=right | 2.9 km || 
|-id=034 bgcolor=#d6d6d6
| 522034 ||  || — || March 31, 2012 || Kitt Peak || Spacewatch ||  || align=right | 2.0 km || 
|-id=035 bgcolor=#d6d6d6
| 522035 ||  || — || October 1, 2014 || Haleakala || Pan-STARRS ||  || align=right | 2.2 km || 
|-id=036 bgcolor=#E9E9E9
| 522036 ||  || — || August 28, 2006 || Kitt Peak || Spacewatch ||  || align=right | 1.1 km || 
|-id=037 bgcolor=#d6d6d6
| 522037 ||  || — || March 26, 2006 || Mount Lemmon || Mount Lemmon Survey ||  || align=right | 2.8 km || 
|-id=038 bgcolor=#d6d6d6
| 522038 ||  || — || October 30, 2014 || Kitt Peak || Spacewatch ||  || align=right | 2.4 km || 
|-id=039 bgcolor=#d6d6d6
| 522039 ||  || — || November 5, 2010 || Mount Lemmon || Mount Lemmon Survey ||  || align=right | 2.6 km || 
|-id=040 bgcolor=#E9E9E9
| 522040 ||  || — || November 20, 2006 || Kitt Peak || Spacewatch ||  || align=right | 1.3 km || 
|-id=041 bgcolor=#fefefe
| 522041 ||  || — || March 18, 2009 || Kitt Peak || Spacewatch ||  || align=right data-sort-value="0.71" | 710 m || 
|-id=042 bgcolor=#d6d6d6
| 522042 ||  || — || September 19, 2009 || Kitt Peak || Spacewatch ||  || align=right | 2.2 km || 
|-id=043 bgcolor=#d6d6d6
| 522043 ||  || — || September 21, 2009 || Kitt Peak || Spacewatch ||  || align=right | 2.0 km || 
|-id=044 bgcolor=#E9E9E9
| 522044 ||  || — || October 24, 2005 || Kitt Peak || Spacewatch ||  || align=right | 2.4 km || 
|-id=045 bgcolor=#d6d6d6
| 522045 ||  || — || March 14, 2011 || Mount Lemmon || Mount Lemmon Survey ||  || align=right | 3.1 km || 
|-id=046 bgcolor=#E9E9E9
| 522046 ||  || — || April 4, 2008 || Kitt Peak || Spacewatch ||  || align=right | 1.9 km || 
|-id=047 bgcolor=#d6d6d6
| 522047 ||  || — || November 11, 2004 || Kitt Peak || Spacewatch ||  || align=right | 2.8 km || 
|-id=048 bgcolor=#E9E9E9
| 522048 ||  || — || February 29, 2012 || Kitt Peak || Spacewatch ||  || align=right | 1.5 km || 
|-id=049 bgcolor=#d6d6d6
| 522049 ||  || — || September 8, 2013 || Haleakala || Pan-STARRS ||  || align=right | 3.6 km || 
|-id=050 bgcolor=#d6d6d6
| 522050 ||  || — || April 2, 2011 || Mount Lemmon || Mount Lemmon Survey ||  || align=right | 2.5 km || 
|-id=051 bgcolor=#E9E9E9
| 522051 ||  || — || October 13, 2010 || Mount Lemmon || Mount Lemmon Survey ||  || align=right | 1.9 km || 
|-id=052 bgcolor=#d6d6d6
| 522052 ||  || — || August 9, 2013 || Kitt Peak || Spacewatch ||  || align=right | 2.9 km || 
|-id=053 bgcolor=#E9E9E9
| 522053 ||  || — || December 13, 2006 || Kitt Peak || Spacewatch ||  || align=right | 1.8 km || 
|-id=054 bgcolor=#E9E9E9
| 522054 ||  || — || December 1, 2005 || Kitt Peak || Spacewatch ||  || align=right | 2.0 km || 
|-id=055 bgcolor=#d6d6d6
| 522055 ||  || — || January 13, 2005 || Kitt Peak || Spacewatch ||  || align=right | 2.4 km || 
|-id=056 bgcolor=#fefefe
| 522056 ||  || — || December 4, 2007 || Kitt Peak || Spacewatch ||  || align=right data-sort-value="0.86" | 860 m || 
|-id=057 bgcolor=#d6d6d6
| 522057 ||  || — || April 20, 2006 || Kitt Peak || Spacewatch ||  || align=right | 2.9 km || 
|-id=058 bgcolor=#E9E9E9
| 522058 ||  || — || December 12, 2006 || Kitt Peak || Spacewatch ||  || align=right | 1.4 km || 
|-id=059 bgcolor=#d6d6d6
| 522059 ||  || — || April 6, 2011 || Mount Lemmon || Mount Lemmon Survey ||  || align=right | 2.9 km || 
|-id=060 bgcolor=#E9E9E9
| 522060 ||  || — || March 24, 2012 || Catalina || CSS ||  || align=right | 1.6 km || 
|-id=061 bgcolor=#d6d6d6
| 522061 ||  || — || October 22, 2014 || Kitt Peak || Spacewatch ||  || align=right | 2.5 km || 
|-id=062 bgcolor=#E9E9E9
| 522062 ||  || — || March 12, 2008 || Mount Lemmon || Mount Lemmon Survey ||  || align=right | 1.8 km || 
|-id=063 bgcolor=#d6d6d6
| 522063 ||  || — || November 4, 2004 || Kitt Peak || Spacewatch ||  || align=right | 2.7 km || 
|-id=064 bgcolor=#E9E9E9
| 522064 ||  || — || October 26, 2009 || Mount Lemmon || Mount Lemmon Survey ||  || align=right | 3.0 km || 
|-id=065 bgcolor=#d6d6d6
| 522065 ||  || — || March 30, 2011 || Haleakala || Pan-STARRS ||  || align=right | 2.2 km || 
|-id=066 bgcolor=#d6d6d6
| 522066 ||  || — || April 3, 2011 || Haleakala || Pan-STARRS ||  || align=right | 2.7 km || 
|-id=067 bgcolor=#E9E9E9
| 522067 ||  || — || March 12, 2008 || Kitt Peak || Spacewatch ||  || align=right | 1.00 km || 
|-id=068 bgcolor=#d6d6d6
| 522068 ||  || — || September 27, 2008 || Mount Lemmon || Mount Lemmon Survey ||  || align=right | 2.4 km || 
|-id=069 bgcolor=#d6d6d6
| 522069 ||  || — || March 28, 2011 || Mount Lemmon || Mount Lemmon Survey ||  || align=right | 2.3 km || 
|-id=070 bgcolor=#E9E9E9
| 522070 ||  || — || February 27, 2012 || Haleakala || Pan-STARRS ||  || align=right | 1.3 km || 
|-id=071 bgcolor=#d6d6d6
| 522071 ||  || — || December 16, 2004 || Kitt Peak || Spacewatch ||  || align=right | 2.8 km || 
|-id=072 bgcolor=#fefefe
| 522072 ||  || — || October 3, 2014 || Mount Lemmon || Mount Lemmon Survey ||  || align=right data-sort-value="0.74" | 740 m || 
|-id=073 bgcolor=#E9E9E9
| 522073 ||  || — || June 23, 2009 || Mount Lemmon || Mount Lemmon Survey ||  || align=right | 1.0 km || 
|-id=074 bgcolor=#d6d6d6
| 522074 ||  || — || December 28, 2005 || Kitt Peak || Spacewatch ||  || align=right | 3.1 km || 
|-id=075 bgcolor=#d6d6d6
| 522075 ||  || — || January 16, 2005 || Kitt Peak || Spacewatch ||  || align=right | 2.4 km || 
|-id=076 bgcolor=#d6d6d6
| 522076 ||  || — || April 25, 2007 || Kitt Peak || Spacewatch ||  || align=right | 1.9 km || 
|-id=077 bgcolor=#E9E9E9
| 522077 ||  || — || March 25, 2012 || Catalina || CSS ||  || align=right | 1.8 km || 
|-id=078 bgcolor=#E9E9E9
| 522078 ||  || — || May 15, 2012 || Haleakala || Pan-STARRS ||  || align=right | 2.1 km || 
|-id=079 bgcolor=#d6d6d6
| 522079 ||  || — || November 30, 2005 || Mount Lemmon || Mount Lemmon Survey ||  || align=right | 2.8 km || 
|-id=080 bgcolor=#d6d6d6
| 522080 ||  || — || February 27, 2012 || Haleakala || Pan-STARRS ||  || align=right | 2.7 km || 
|-id=081 bgcolor=#d6d6d6
| 522081 ||  || — || January 25, 2011 || Mount Lemmon || Mount Lemmon Survey ||  || align=right | 2.6 km || 
|-id=082 bgcolor=#E9E9E9
| 522082 ||  || — || March 17, 2012 || Mount Lemmon || Mount Lemmon Survey ||  || align=right | 1.7 km || 
|-id=083 bgcolor=#E9E9E9
| 522083 ||  || — || January 26, 2012 || Kitt Peak || Spacewatch ||  || align=right | 1.8 km || 
|-id=084 bgcolor=#d6d6d6
| 522084 ||  || — || October 25, 2009 || Kitt Peak || Spacewatch ||  || align=right | 2.1 km || 
|-id=085 bgcolor=#d6d6d6
| 522085 ||  || — || December 5, 2010 || Kitt Peak || Spacewatch ||  || align=right | 2.4 km || 
|-id=086 bgcolor=#E9E9E9
| 522086 ||  || — || November 28, 2011 || Mount Lemmon || Mount Lemmon Survey ||  || align=right | 1.6 km || 
|-id=087 bgcolor=#d6d6d6
| 522087 ||  || — || December 14, 2015 || Haleakala || Pan-STARRS || Tj (2.98) || align=right | 4.0 km || 
|-id=088 bgcolor=#d6d6d6
| 522088 ||  || — || September 14, 2014 || Haleakala || Pan-STARRS ||  || align=right | 3.3 km || 
|-id=089 bgcolor=#fefefe
| 522089 ||  || — || December 30, 2008 || Mount Lemmon || Mount Lemmon Survey ||  || align=right data-sort-value="0.96" | 960 m || 
|-id=090 bgcolor=#E9E9E9
| 522090 ||  || — || April 21, 2012 || Haleakala || Pan-STARRS ||  || align=right | 2.6 km || 
|-id=091 bgcolor=#d6d6d6
| 522091 ||  || — || January 30, 2011 || Haleakala || Pan-STARRS ||  || align=right | 2.5 km || 
|-id=092 bgcolor=#d6d6d6
| 522092 ||  || — || October 2, 2014 || Catalina || CSS ||  || align=right | 2.7 km || 
|-id=093 bgcolor=#d6d6d6
| 522093 ||  || — || August 6, 2014 || Haleakala || Pan-STARRS ||  || align=right | 2.2 km || 
|-id=094 bgcolor=#d6d6d6
| 522094 ||  || — || December 25, 2010 || Mount Lemmon || Mount Lemmon Survey ||  || align=right | 2.8 km || 
|-id=095 bgcolor=#E9E9E9
| 522095 ||  || — || January 10, 2007 || Kitt Peak || Spacewatch ||  || align=right | 1.8 km || 
|-id=096 bgcolor=#d6d6d6
| 522096 ||  || — || December 11, 2010 || Mount Lemmon || Mount Lemmon Survey ||  || align=right | 2.9 km || 
|-id=097 bgcolor=#fefefe
| 522097 ||  || — || April 17, 2013 || Haleakala || Pan-STARRS ||  || align=right data-sort-value="0.87" | 870 m || 
|-id=098 bgcolor=#d6d6d6
| 522098 ||  || — || September 16, 2003 || Kitt Peak || Spacewatch ||  || align=right | 2.2 km || 
|-id=099 bgcolor=#E9E9E9
| 522099 ||  || — || December 3, 2010 || Mount Lemmon || Mount Lemmon Survey ||  || align=right | 1.8 km || 
|-id=100 bgcolor=#E9E9E9
| 522100 ||  || — || August 30, 2005 || Kitt Peak || Spacewatch ||  || align=right | 1.8 km || 
|}

522101–522200 

|-bgcolor=#d6d6d6
| 522101 ||  || — || November 19, 2009 || Kitt Peak || Spacewatch ||  || align=right | 2.9 km || 
|-id=102 bgcolor=#E9E9E9
| 522102 ||  || — || September 19, 2014 || Haleakala || Pan-STARRS ||  || align=right | 1.9 km || 
|-id=103 bgcolor=#E9E9E9
| 522103 ||  || — || April 8, 2008 || Kitt Peak || Spacewatch ||  || align=right | 1.3 km || 
|-id=104 bgcolor=#E9E9E9
| 522104 ||  || — || February 4, 2012 || Haleakala || Pan-STARRS ||  || align=right | 1.3 km || 
|-id=105 bgcolor=#d6d6d6
| 522105 ||  || — || October 27, 2014 || Haleakala || Pan-STARRS ||  || align=right | 2.7 km || 
|-id=106 bgcolor=#d6d6d6
| 522106 ||  || — || April 17, 2012 || Kitt Peak || Spacewatch ||  || align=right | 3.4 km || 
|-id=107 bgcolor=#d6d6d6
| 522107 ||  || — || September 7, 2008 || Mount Lemmon || Mount Lemmon Survey ||  || align=right | 3.6 km || 
|-id=108 bgcolor=#d6d6d6
| 522108 ||  || — || October 24, 2009 || Kitt Peak || Spacewatch ||  || align=right | 2.4 km || 
|-id=109 bgcolor=#d6d6d6
| 522109 ||  || — || September 29, 2014 || Haleakala || Pan-STARRS ||  || align=right | 2.6 km || 
|-id=110 bgcolor=#E9E9E9
| 522110 ||  || — || November 1, 2005 || Kitt Peak || Spacewatch ||  || align=right | 2.3 km || 
|-id=111 bgcolor=#d6d6d6
| 522111 ||  || — || March 29, 2012 || Mount Lemmon || Mount Lemmon Survey ||  || align=right | 2.2 km || 
|-id=112 bgcolor=#fefefe
| 522112 ||  || — || November 1, 2007 || Kitt Peak || Spacewatch ||  || align=right data-sort-value="0.87" | 870 m || 
|-id=113 bgcolor=#E9E9E9
| 522113 ||  || — || October 7, 1994 || Kitt Peak || Spacewatch ||  || align=right | 1.2 km || 
|-id=114 bgcolor=#d6d6d6
| 522114 ||  || — || January 25, 2011 || Kitt Peak || Spacewatch ||  || align=right | 2.3 km || 
|-id=115 bgcolor=#E9E9E9
| 522115 ||  || — || February 12, 2012 || Catalina || CSS ||  || align=right | 1.0 km || 
|-id=116 bgcolor=#E9E9E9
| 522116 ||  || — || April 13, 2008 || Mount Lemmon || Mount Lemmon Survey ||  || align=right | 2.9 km || 
|-id=117 bgcolor=#E9E9E9
| 522117 ||  || — || August 30, 2005 || Kitt Peak || Spacewatch ||  || align=right | 1.6 km || 
|-id=118 bgcolor=#d6d6d6
| 522118 ||  || — || August 7, 2008 || Kitt Peak || Spacewatch ||  || align=right | 2.8 km || 
|-id=119 bgcolor=#d6d6d6
| 522119 ||  || — || September 4, 2008 || Kitt Peak || Spacewatch ||  || align=right | 3.1 km || 
|-id=120 bgcolor=#d6d6d6
| 522120 ||  || — || June 18, 2013 || Haleakala || Pan-STARRS ||  || align=right | 3.1 km || 
|-id=121 bgcolor=#E9E9E9
| 522121 ||  || — || December 13, 2006 || Kitt Peak || Spacewatch ||  || align=right | 1.8 km || 
|-id=122 bgcolor=#fefefe
| 522122 ||  || — || December 19, 2004 || Mount Lemmon || Mount Lemmon Survey ||  || align=right data-sort-value="0.63" | 630 m || 
|-id=123 bgcolor=#E9E9E9
| 522123 ||  || — || January 3, 2016 || Haleakala || Pan-STARRS ||  || align=right | 1.3 km || 
|-id=124 bgcolor=#E9E9E9
| 522124 ||  || — || February 16, 2012 || Haleakala || Pan-STARRS ||  || align=right | 1.5 km || 
|-id=125 bgcolor=#d6d6d6
| 522125 ||  || — || July 14, 2013 || Haleakala || Pan-STARRS ||  || align=right | 2.7 km || 
|-id=126 bgcolor=#d6d6d6
| 522126 ||  || — || January 16, 2000 || Kitt Peak || Spacewatch ||  || align=right | 2.2 km || 
|-id=127 bgcolor=#d6d6d6
| 522127 ||  || — || October 15, 2009 || Mount Lemmon || Mount Lemmon Survey ||  || align=right | 1.9 km || 
|-id=128 bgcolor=#d6d6d6
| 522128 ||  || — || November 23, 2009 || Kitt Peak || Spacewatch ||  || align=right | 1.9 km || 
|-id=129 bgcolor=#E9E9E9
| 522129 ||  || — || January 26, 2007 || Kitt Peak || Spacewatch ||  || align=right | 2.5 km || 
|-id=130 bgcolor=#d6d6d6
| 522130 ||  || — || June 18, 2013 || Haleakala || Pan-STARRS ||  || align=right | 1.9 km || 
|-id=131 bgcolor=#d6d6d6
| 522131 ||  || — || January 31, 2006 || Kitt Peak || Spacewatch ||  || align=right | 2.5 km || 
|-id=132 bgcolor=#E9E9E9
| 522132 ||  || — || September 29, 2014 || Haleakala || Pan-STARRS ||  || align=right | 1.9 km || 
|-id=133 bgcolor=#d6d6d6
| 522133 ||  || — || July 15, 2013 || Haleakala || Pan-STARRS ||  || align=right | 2.9 km || 
|-id=134 bgcolor=#d6d6d6
| 522134 ||  || — || March 27, 2011 || Mount Lemmon || Mount Lemmon Survey ||  || align=right | 2.4 km || 
|-id=135 bgcolor=#E9E9E9
| 522135 ||  || — || August 15, 2009 || Kitt Peak || Spacewatch ||  || align=right | 2.1 km || 
|-id=136 bgcolor=#E9E9E9
| 522136 ||  || — || February 27, 2012 || Haleakala || Pan-STARRS ||  || align=right data-sort-value="0.97" | 970 m || 
|-id=137 bgcolor=#E9E9E9
| 522137 ||  || — || August 25, 2014 || Haleakala || Pan-STARRS ||  || align=right | 1.9 km || 
|-id=138 bgcolor=#d6d6d6
| 522138 ||  || — || January 30, 2011 || Mount Lemmon || Mount Lemmon Survey ||  || align=right | 2.8 km || 
|-id=139 bgcolor=#E9E9E9
| 522139 ||  || — || January 15, 2008 || Kitt Peak || Spacewatch ||  || align=right | 1.0 km || 
|-id=140 bgcolor=#E9E9E9
| 522140 ||  || — || November 1, 2010 || Kitt Peak || Spacewatch ||  || align=right | 1.6 km || 
|-id=141 bgcolor=#d6d6d6
| 522141 ||  || — || February 10, 2011 || Mount Lemmon || Mount Lemmon Survey ||  || align=right | 2.4 km || 
|-id=142 bgcolor=#E9E9E9
| 522142 ||  || — || February 25, 2007 || Mount Lemmon || Mount Lemmon Survey ||  || align=right | 1.9 km || 
|-id=143 bgcolor=#E9E9E9
| 522143 ||  || — || March 15, 2012 || Mount Lemmon || Mount Lemmon Survey ||  || align=right | 1.4 km || 
|-id=144 bgcolor=#d6d6d6
| 522144 ||  || — || September 23, 2008 || Mount Lemmon || Mount Lemmon Survey ||  || align=right | 2.6 km || 
|-id=145 bgcolor=#E9E9E9
| 522145 ||  || — || May 15, 2008 || Kitt Peak || Spacewatch ||  || align=right | 1.4 km || 
|-id=146 bgcolor=#d6d6d6
| 522146 ||  || — || November 8, 2009 || Kitt Peak || Spacewatch ||  || align=right | 3.1 km || 
|-id=147 bgcolor=#E9E9E9
| 522147 ||  || — || October 28, 2005 || Kitt Peak || Spacewatch ||  || align=right | 1.8 km || 
|-id=148 bgcolor=#d6d6d6
| 522148 ||  || — || October 23, 2009 || Kitt Peak || Spacewatch ||  || align=right | 2.4 km || 
|-id=149 bgcolor=#E9E9E9
| 522149 ||  || — || June 13, 2004 || Kitt Peak || Spacewatch ||  || align=right | 2.0 km || 
|-id=150 bgcolor=#d6d6d6
| 522150 ||  || — || February 14, 2005 || Kitt Peak || Spacewatch ||  || align=right | 3.1 km || 
|-id=151 bgcolor=#E9E9E9
| 522151 ||  || — || July 6, 2005 || Kitt Peak || Spacewatch ||  || align=right data-sort-value="0.81" | 810 m || 
|-id=152 bgcolor=#E9E9E9
| 522152 ||  || — || May 1, 2004 || Kitt Peak || Spacewatch ||  || align=right | 1.8 km || 
|-id=153 bgcolor=#E9E9E9
| 522153 ||  || — || February 1, 2008 || Mount Lemmon || Mount Lemmon Survey ||  || align=right data-sort-value="0.82" | 820 m || 
|-id=154 bgcolor=#d6d6d6
| 522154 ||  || — || January 28, 2011 || Mount Lemmon || Mount Lemmon Survey ||  || align=right | 2.4 km || 
|-id=155 bgcolor=#d6d6d6
| 522155 ||  || — || September 24, 2008 || Mount Lemmon || Mount Lemmon Survey ||  || align=right | 3.4 km || 
|-id=156 bgcolor=#E9E9E9
| 522156 ||  || — || April 14, 2008 || Kitt Peak || Spacewatch ||  || align=right | 1.3 km || 
|-id=157 bgcolor=#d6d6d6
| 522157 ||  || — || October 2, 2003 || Kitt Peak || Spacewatch ||  || align=right | 3.3 km || 
|-id=158 bgcolor=#fefefe
| 522158 ||  || — || December 1, 2008 || Kitt Peak || Spacewatch ||  || align=right data-sort-value="0.68" | 680 m || 
|-id=159 bgcolor=#fefefe
| 522159 ||  || — || December 6, 2011 || Haleakala || Pan-STARRS ||  || align=right data-sort-value="0.80" | 800 m || 
|-id=160 bgcolor=#E9E9E9
| 522160 ||  || — || November 7, 2010 || Mount Lemmon || Mount Lemmon Survey ||  || align=right | 1.3 km || 
|-id=161 bgcolor=#E9E9E9
| 522161 ||  || — || October 26, 2005 || Kitt Peak || Spacewatch ||  || align=right | 1.8 km || 
|-id=162 bgcolor=#fefefe
| 522162 ||  || — || December 28, 2011 || Kitt Peak || Spacewatch ||  || align=right data-sort-value="0.69" | 690 m || 
|-id=163 bgcolor=#d6d6d6
| 522163 ||  || — || January 30, 2011 || Haleakala || Pan-STARRS ||  || align=right | 2.1 km || 
|-id=164 bgcolor=#d6d6d6
| 522164 ||  || — || April 21, 2012 || Mount Lemmon || Mount Lemmon Survey ||  || align=right | 2.7 km || 
|-id=165 bgcolor=#E9E9E9
| 522165 ||  || — || April 1, 2008 || Kitt Peak || Spacewatch ||  || align=right | 2.1 km || 
|-id=166 bgcolor=#d6d6d6
| 522166 ||  || — || June 13, 2012 || Mount Lemmon || Mount Lemmon Survey ||  || align=right | 2.9 km || 
|-id=167 bgcolor=#fefefe
| 522167 ||  || — || November 7, 2007 || Kitt Peak || Spacewatch ||  || align=right data-sort-value="0.55" | 550 m || 
|-id=168 bgcolor=#d6d6d6
| 522168 ||  || — || June 18, 2013 || Haleakala || Pan-STARRS ||  || align=right | 2.6 km || 
|-id=169 bgcolor=#d6d6d6
| 522169 ||  || — || April 7, 2007 || Mount Lemmon || Mount Lemmon Survey ||  || align=right | 1.8 km || 
|-id=170 bgcolor=#d6d6d6
| 522170 ||  || — || September 24, 2014 || Kitt Peak || Spacewatch ||  || align=right | 1.9 km || 
|-id=171 bgcolor=#d6d6d6
| 522171 ||  || — || March 11, 2011 || Kitt Peak || Spacewatch ||  || align=right | 2.4 km || 
|-id=172 bgcolor=#d6d6d6
| 522172 ||  || — || October 21, 2014 || Kitt Peak || Spacewatch ||  || align=right | 2.3 km || 
|-id=173 bgcolor=#E9E9E9
| 522173 ||  || — || January 15, 2008 || Kitt Peak || Spacewatch ||  || align=right data-sort-value="0.86" | 860 m || 
|-id=174 bgcolor=#d6d6d6
| 522174 ||  || — || September 6, 2014 || Mount Lemmon || Mount Lemmon Survey ||  || align=right | 2.6 km || 
|-id=175 bgcolor=#d6d6d6
| 522175 ||  || — || January 26, 2011 || Kitt Peak || Spacewatch ||  || align=right | 2.0 km || 
|-id=176 bgcolor=#d6d6d6
| 522176 ||  || — || January 15, 2005 || Kitt Peak || Spacewatch ||  || align=right | 2.2 km || 
|-id=177 bgcolor=#d6d6d6
| 522177 ||  || — || December 26, 2009 || Kitt Peak || Spacewatch ||  || align=right | 2.8 km || 
|-id=178 bgcolor=#d6d6d6
| 522178 ||  || — || September 15, 2009 || Kitt Peak || Spacewatch ||  || align=right | 1.8 km || 
|-id=179 bgcolor=#d6d6d6
| 522179 ||  || — || April 21, 2012 || Mount Lemmon || Mount Lemmon Survey ||  || align=right | 3.7 km || 
|-id=180 bgcolor=#E9E9E9
| 522180 ||  || — || November 1, 2006 || Kitt Peak || Spacewatch ||  || align=right data-sort-value="0.94" | 940 m || 
|-id=181 bgcolor=#d6d6d6
| 522181 ||  || — || November 27, 2009 || Kitt Peak || Spacewatch ||  || align=right | 2.2 km || 
|-id=182 bgcolor=#d6d6d6
| 522182 ||  || — || December 17, 2009 || Kitt Peak || Spacewatch ||  || align=right | 2.4 km || 
|-id=183 bgcolor=#E9E9E9
| 522183 ||  || — || March 25, 2012 || Mount Lemmon || Mount Lemmon Survey ||  || align=right | 1.7 km || 
|-id=184 bgcolor=#E9E9E9
| 522184 ||  || — || November 27, 2006 || Kitt Peak || Spacewatch ||  || align=right | 1.3 km || 
|-id=185 bgcolor=#E9E9E9
| 522185 ||  || — || November 7, 2010 || Kitt Peak || Spacewatch ||  || align=right | 1.4 km || 
|-id=186 bgcolor=#E9E9E9
| 522186 ||  || — || January 19, 2012 || Kitt Peak || Spacewatch ||  || align=right | 1.5 km || 
|-id=187 bgcolor=#d6d6d6
| 522187 ||  || — || March 14, 2011 || Mount Lemmon || Mount Lemmon Survey ||  || align=right | 2.2 km || 
|-id=188 bgcolor=#E9E9E9
| 522188 ||  || — || January 28, 2007 || Mount Lemmon || Mount Lemmon Survey ||  || align=right | 2.0 km || 
|-id=189 bgcolor=#fefefe
| 522189 ||  || — || April 21, 2013 || Mount Lemmon || Mount Lemmon Survey ||  || align=right data-sort-value="0.57" | 570 m || 
|-id=190 bgcolor=#E9E9E9
| 522190 ||  || — || July 27, 2009 || Catalina || CSS ||  || align=right | 1.8 km || 
|-id=191 bgcolor=#E9E9E9
| 522191 ||  || — || February 21, 2007 || Mount Lemmon || Mount Lemmon Survey ||  || align=right | 1.7 km || 
|-id=192 bgcolor=#E9E9E9
| 522192 ||  || — || April 16, 2012 || Haleakala || Pan-STARRS ||  || align=right | 1.8 km || 
|-id=193 bgcolor=#E9E9E9
| 522193 ||  || — || March 28, 2012 || Haleakala || Pan-STARRS ||  || align=right | 1.2 km || 
|-id=194 bgcolor=#E9E9E9
| 522194 ||  || — || January 17, 2007 || Kitt Peak || Spacewatch ||  || align=right | 1.4 km || 
|-id=195 bgcolor=#E9E9E9
| 522195 ||  || — || November 25, 2005 || Kitt Peak || Spacewatch ||  || align=right | 2.5 km || 
|-id=196 bgcolor=#d6d6d6
| 522196 ||  || — || November 7, 2008 || Mount Lemmon || Mount Lemmon Survey ||  || align=right | 2.9 km || 
|-id=197 bgcolor=#d6d6d6
| 522197 ||  || — || March 26, 2011 || Mount Lemmon || Mount Lemmon Survey ||  || align=right | 2.7 km || 
|-id=198 bgcolor=#d6d6d6
| 522198 ||  || — || October 28, 2008 || Kitt Peak || Spacewatch ||  || align=right | 3.0 km || 
|-id=199 bgcolor=#d6d6d6
| 522199 ||  || — || October 13, 2013 || Mount Lemmon || Mount Lemmon Survey ||  || align=right | 2.4 km || 
|-id=200 bgcolor=#fefefe
| 522200 ||  || — || December 22, 2008 || Mount Lemmon || Mount Lemmon Survey ||  || align=right data-sort-value="0.57" | 570 m || 
|}

522201–522300 

|-bgcolor=#E9E9E9
| 522201 ||  || — || February 23, 2012 || Kitt Peak || Spacewatch ||  || align=right data-sort-value="0.67" | 670 m || 
|-id=202 bgcolor=#d6d6d6
| 522202 ||  || — || January 8, 2016 || Haleakala || Pan-STARRS || 7:4 || align=right | 2.8 km || 
|-id=203 bgcolor=#E9E9E9
| 522203 ||  || — || April 24, 2003 || Campo Imperatore || CINEOS ||  || align=right | 2.1 km || 
|-id=204 bgcolor=#E9E9E9
| 522204 ||  || — || November 28, 2005 || Kitt Peak || Spacewatch ||  || align=right | 2.2 km || 
|-id=205 bgcolor=#d6d6d6
| 522205 ||  || — || July 18, 2012 || Catalina || CSS ||  || align=right | 3.4 km || 
|-id=206 bgcolor=#E9E9E9
| 522206 ||  || — || March 10, 2008 || Kitt Peak || Spacewatch ||  || align=right data-sort-value="0.85" | 850 m || 
|-id=207 bgcolor=#d6d6d6
| 522207 ||  || — || November 7, 2008 || Mount Lemmon || Mount Lemmon Survey ||  || align=right | 2.2 km || 
|-id=208 bgcolor=#E9E9E9
| 522208 ||  || — || November 17, 2014 || Haleakala || Pan-STARRS ||  || align=right data-sort-value="0.81" | 810 m || 
|-id=209 bgcolor=#E9E9E9
| 522209 ||  || — || February 27, 2012 || Haleakala || Pan-STARRS ||  || align=right data-sort-value="0.91" | 910 m || 
|-id=210 bgcolor=#d6d6d6
| 522210 ||  || — || July 29, 2008 || Mount Lemmon || Mount Lemmon Survey ||  || align=right | 2.2 km || 
|-id=211 bgcolor=#E9E9E9
| 522211 ||  || — || February 8, 2011 || Mount Lemmon || Mount Lemmon Survey ||  || align=right | 2.3 km || 
|-id=212 bgcolor=#E9E9E9
| 522212 ||  || — || January 17, 2007 || Kitt Peak || Spacewatch ||  || align=right | 1.5 km || 
|-id=213 bgcolor=#d6d6d6
| 522213 ||  || — || August 25, 2012 || Catalina || CSS ||  || align=right | 3.1 km || 
|-id=214 bgcolor=#E9E9E9
| 522214 ||  || — || September 7, 2004 || Kitt Peak || Spacewatch ||  || align=right | 2.2 km || 
|-id=215 bgcolor=#E9E9E9
| 522215 ||  || — || February 9, 2007 || Kitt Peak || Spacewatch ||  || align=right | 2.3 km || 
|-id=216 bgcolor=#E9E9E9
| 522216 ||  || — || March 17, 2012 || Kitt Peak || Spacewatch ||  || align=right data-sort-value="0.87" | 870 m || 
|-id=217 bgcolor=#fefefe
| 522217 ||  || — || December 31, 2007 || Kitt Peak || Spacewatch ||  || align=right data-sort-value="0.68" | 680 m || 
|-id=218 bgcolor=#d6d6d6
| 522218 ||  || — || April 7, 2005 || Kitt Peak || Spacewatch ||  || align=right | 2.2 km || 
|-id=219 bgcolor=#fefefe
| 522219 ||  || — || December 17, 2007 || Kitt Peak || Spacewatch ||  || align=right data-sort-value="0.89" | 890 m || 
|-id=220 bgcolor=#E9E9E9
| 522220 ||  || — || March 1, 2008 || Kitt Peak || Spacewatch ||  || align=right | 1.3 km || 
|-id=221 bgcolor=#fefefe
| 522221 ||  || — || January 27, 2012 || Mount Lemmon || Mount Lemmon Survey ||  || align=right data-sort-value="0.76" | 760 m || 
|-id=222 bgcolor=#fefefe
| 522222 ||  || — || January 19, 2012 || Kitt Peak || Spacewatch ||  || align=right data-sort-value="0.89" | 890 m || 
|-id=223 bgcolor=#d6d6d6
| 522223 ||  || — || June 13, 2007 || Kitt Peak || Spacewatch ||  || align=right | 2.6 km || 
|-id=224 bgcolor=#E9E9E9
| 522224 ||  || — || November 16, 2006 || Mount Lemmon || Mount Lemmon Survey ||  || align=right | 1.1 km || 
|-id=225 bgcolor=#d6d6d6
| 522225 ||  || — || March 26, 2011 || Kitt Peak || Spacewatch ||  || align=right | 3.4 km || 
|-id=226 bgcolor=#d6d6d6
| 522226 ||  || — || May 15, 2012 || Haleakala || Pan-STARRS ||  || align=right | 3.0 km || 
|-id=227 bgcolor=#E9E9E9
| 522227 ||  || — || November 11, 2010 || Mount Lemmon || Mount Lemmon Survey ||  || align=right | 1.0 km || 
|-id=228 bgcolor=#d6d6d6
| 522228 ||  || — || November 12, 2013 || Kitt Peak || Spacewatch ||  || align=right | 3.6 km || 
|-id=229 bgcolor=#d6d6d6
| 522229 ||  || — || July 7, 2013 || Kitt Peak || Spacewatch ||  || align=right | 3.0 km || 
|-id=230 bgcolor=#E9E9E9
| 522230 ||  || — || March 11, 2008 || Kitt Peak || Spacewatch ||  || align=right | 1.3 km || 
|-id=231 bgcolor=#E9E9E9
| 522231 ||  || — || September 5, 2010 || Mount Lemmon || Mount Lemmon Survey ||  || align=right | 1.1 km || 
|-id=232 bgcolor=#E9E9E9
| 522232 ||  || — || August 15, 2009 || Catalina || CSS ||  || align=right | 1.9 km || 
|-id=233 bgcolor=#E9E9E9
| 522233 ||  || — || February 3, 2012 || Mount Lemmon || Mount Lemmon Survey ||  || align=right | 2.1 km || 
|-id=234 bgcolor=#E9E9E9
| 522234 ||  || — || December 9, 2010 || Mount Lemmon || Mount Lemmon Survey ||  || align=right | 2.1 km || 
|-id=235 bgcolor=#E9E9E9
| 522235 ||  || — || April 24, 2012 || Haleakala || Pan-STARRS ||  || align=right | 1.7 km || 
|-id=236 bgcolor=#E9E9E9
| 522236 ||  || — || December 25, 2010 || Mount Lemmon || Mount Lemmon Survey ||  || align=right | 1.2 km || 
|-id=237 bgcolor=#E9E9E9
| 522237 ||  || — || October 31, 2010 || Mount Lemmon || Mount Lemmon Survey ||  || align=right | 1.1 km || 
|-id=238 bgcolor=#E9E9E9
| 522238 ||  || — || November 1, 2010 || Piszkéstető || K. Sárneczky, Z. Kuli ||  || align=right | 1.5 km || 
|-id=239 bgcolor=#E9E9E9
| 522239 ||  || — || March 6, 2008 || Mount Lemmon || Mount Lemmon Survey ||  || align=right | 1.0 km || 
|-id=240 bgcolor=#E9E9E9
| 522240 ||  || — || January 29, 2007 || Mount Lemmon || Mount Lemmon Survey ||  || align=right | 1.7 km || 
|-id=241 bgcolor=#E9E9E9
| 522241 ||  || — || December 23, 2014 || Mount Lemmon || Mount Lemmon Survey ||  || align=right | 2.0 km || 
|-id=242 bgcolor=#E9E9E9
| 522242 ||  || — || November 17, 2006 || Mount Lemmon || Mount Lemmon Survey ||  || align=right | 1.8 km || 
|-id=243 bgcolor=#d6d6d6
| 522243 ||  || — || October 25, 2014 || Haleakala || Pan-STARRS ||  || align=right | 2.5 km || 
|-id=244 bgcolor=#d6d6d6
| 522244 ||  || — || September 3, 2008 || Kitt Peak || Spacewatch ||  || align=right | 2.5 km || 
|-id=245 bgcolor=#d6d6d6
| 522245 ||  || — || April 2, 2006 || Kitt Peak || Spacewatch ||  || align=right | 2.8 km || 
|-id=246 bgcolor=#d6d6d6
| 522246 ||  || — || September 20, 2014 || Haleakala || Pan-STARRS ||  || align=right | 2.9 km || 
|-id=247 bgcolor=#d6d6d6
| 522247 ||  || — || August 25, 2012 || Catalina || CSS ||  || align=right | 3.2 km || 
|-id=248 bgcolor=#E9E9E9
| 522248 ||  || — || October 23, 2006 || Kitt Peak || Spacewatch ||  || align=right data-sort-value="0.98" | 980 m || 
|-id=249 bgcolor=#d6d6d6
| 522249 ||  || — || May 2, 2006 || Kitt Peak || Spacewatch ||  || align=right | 2.8 km || 
|-id=250 bgcolor=#E9E9E9
| 522250 ||  || — || October 9, 2005 || Kitt Peak || Spacewatch ||  || align=right | 1.3 km || 
|-id=251 bgcolor=#E9E9E9
| 522251 ||  || — || January 29, 2007 || Kitt Peak || Spacewatch ||  || align=right | 2.4 km || 
|-id=252 bgcolor=#E9E9E9
| 522252 ||  || — || March 26, 2007 || Mount Lemmon || Mount Lemmon Survey ||  || align=right | 1.9 km || 
|-id=253 bgcolor=#E9E9E9
| 522253 ||  || — || March 28, 2012 || Kitt Peak || Spacewatch ||  || align=right | 1.8 km || 
|-id=254 bgcolor=#d6d6d6
| 522254 ||  || — || January 13, 2010 || Mount Lemmon || Mount Lemmon Survey ||  || align=right | 2.4 km || 
|-id=255 bgcolor=#d6d6d6
| 522255 ||  || — || September 22, 2008 || Mount Lemmon || Mount Lemmon Survey ||  || align=right | 2.0 km || 
|-id=256 bgcolor=#d6d6d6
| 522256 ||  || — || August 14, 2013 || Haleakala || Pan-STARRS ||  || align=right | 2.4 km || 
|-id=257 bgcolor=#E9E9E9
| 522257 ||  || — || February 22, 2007 || Kitt Peak || Spacewatch ||  || align=right | 1.8 km || 
|-id=258 bgcolor=#fefefe
| 522258 ||  || — || January 27, 2012 || Mount Lemmon || Mount Lemmon Survey ||  || align=right data-sort-value="0.68" | 680 m || 
|-id=259 bgcolor=#d6d6d6
| 522259 ||  || — || November 20, 2014 || Haleakala || Pan-STARRS || 7:4 || align=right | 3.2 km || 
|-id=260 bgcolor=#E9E9E9
| 522260 ||  || — || January 12, 2011 || Mount Lemmon || Mount Lemmon Survey ||  || align=right | 1.9 km || 
|-id=261 bgcolor=#d6d6d6
| 522261 ||  || — || May 21, 2012 || Mount Lemmon || Mount Lemmon Survey ||  || align=right | 2.3 km || 
|-id=262 bgcolor=#E9E9E9
| 522262 ||  || — || January 19, 2012 || Mount Lemmon || Mount Lemmon Survey ||  || align=right data-sort-value="0.75" | 750 m || 
|-id=263 bgcolor=#E9E9E9
| 522263 ||  || — || February 12, 2008 || Mount Lemmon || Mount Lemmon Survey ||  || align=right data-sort-value="0.98" | 980 m || 
|-id=264 bgcolor=#E9E9E9
| 522264 ||  || — || February 26, 2012 || Mount Lemmon || Mount Lemmon Survey ||  || align=right | 1.3 km || 
|-id=265 bgcolor=#E9E9E9
| 522265 ||  || — || November 21, 2005 || Kitt Peak || Spacewatch ||  || align=right | 1.9 km || 
|-id=266 bgcolor=#E9E9E9
| 522266 ||  || — || April 16, 2012 || Haleakala || Pan-STARRS ||  || align=right | 1.3 km || 
|-id=267 bgcolor=#E9E9E9
| 522267 ||  || — || February 19, 2012 || Kitt Peak || Spacewatch ||  || align=right | 1.6 km || 
|-id=268 bgcolor=#fefefe
| 522268 ||  || — || January 15, 2016 || Haleakala || Pan-STARRS ||  || align=right data-sort-value="0.79" | 790 m || 
|-id=269 bgcolor=#E9E9E9
| 522269 ||  || — || August 30, 2005 || Kitt Peak || Spacewatch ||  || align=right | 1.4 km || 
|-id=270 bgcolor=#d6d6d6
| 522270 ||  || — || October 1, 2008 || Mount Lemmon || Mount Lemmon Survey ||  || align=right | 2.7 km || 
|-id=271 bgcolor=#d6d6d6
| 522271 ||  || — || November 18, 2014 || Haleakala || Pan-STARRS ||  || align=right | 2.0 km || 
|-id=272 bgcolor=#E9E9E9
| 522272 ||  || — || May 29, 2009 || Mount Lemmon || Mount Lemmon Survey ||  || align=right | 2.0 km || 
|-id=273 bgcolor=#d6d6d6
| 522273 ||  || — || December 15, 2009 || Mount Lemmon || Mount Lemmon Survey ||  || align=right | 2.7 km || 
|-id=274 bgcolor=#d6d6d6
| 522274 ||  || — || October 5, 2014 || Haleakala || Pan-STARRS ||  || align=right | 3.7 km || 
|-id=275 bgcolor=#d6d6d6
| 522275 ||  || — || April 21, 2012 || Mount Lemmon || Mount Lemmon Survey ||  || align=right | 2.9 km || 
|-id=276 bgcolor=#d6d6d6
| 522276 ||  || — || February 2, 2005 || Kitt Peak || Spacewatch ||  || align=right | 3.4 km || 
|-id=277 bgcolor=#d6d6d6
| 522277 ||  || — || September 15, 2007 || Kitt Peak || Spacewatch ||  || align=right | 3.2 km || 
|-id=278 bgcolor=#d6d6d6
| 522278 ||  || — || August 26, 2013 || Haleakala || Pan-STARRS ||  || align=right | 3.5 km || 
|-id=279 bgcolor=#d6d6d6
| 522279 ||  || — || November 18, 2003 || Kitt Peak || Spacewatch ||  || align=right | 2.5 km || 
|-id=280 bgcolor=#d6d6d6
| 522280 ||  || — || October 5, 2013 || Haleakala || Pan-STARRS ||  || align=right | 2.9 km || 
|-id=281 bgcolor=#E9E9E9
| 522281 ||  || — || January 10, 2007 || Kitt Peak || Spacewatch ||  || align=right | 1.6 km || 
|-id=282 bgcolor=#E9E9E9
| 522282 ||  || — || December 25, 2010 || Mount Lemmon || Mount Lemmon Survey ||  || align=right | 2.3 km || 
|-id=283 bgcolor=#d6d6d6
| 522283 ||  || — || November 1, 2008 || Mount Lemmon || Mount Lemmon Survey ||  || align=right | 3.6 km || 
|-id=284 bgcolor=#d6d6d6
| 522284 ||  || — || March 9, 2011 || Kitt Peak || Spacewatch ||  || align=right | 2.5 km || 
|-id=285 bgcolor=#E9E9E9
| 522285 ||  || — || March 11, 2008 || Kitt Peak || Spacewatch ||  || align=right data-sort-value="0.80" | 800 m || 
|-id=286 bgcolor=#fefefe
| 522286 ||  || — || October 28, 2014 || Haleakala || Pan-STARRS ||  || align=right data-sort-value="0.79" | 790 m || 
|-id=287 bgcolor=#fefefe
| 522287 ||  || — || March 19, 2013 || Haleakala || Pan-STARRS ||  || align=right data-sort-value="0.44" | 440 m || 
|-id=288 bgcolor=#E9E9E9
| 522288 ||  || — || March 10, 2008 || Kitt Peak || Spacewatch ||  || align=right | 1.3 km || 
|-id=289 bgcolor=#d6d6d6
| 522289 ||  || — || June 16, 2012 || Haleakala || Pan-STARRS ||  || align=right | 4.0 km || 
|-id=290 bgcolor=#d6d6d6
| 522290 ||  || — || October 21, 2008 || Kitt Peak || Spacewatch ||  || align=right | 2.7 km || 
|-id=291 bgcolor=#d6d6d6
| 522291 ||  || — || August 12, 2013 || Haleakala || Pan-STARRS ||  || align=right | 2.2 km || 
|-id=292 bgcolor=#E9E9E9
| 522292 ||  || — || November 2, 2010 || Kitt Peak || Spacewatch ||  || align=right | 1.2 km || 
|-id=293 bgcolor=#d6d6d6
| 522293 ||  || — || January 30, 2011 || Haleakala || Pan-STARRS ||  || align=right | 1.8 km || 
|-id=294 bgcolor=#fefefe
| 522294 ||  || — || January 18, 2012 || Mount Lemmon || Mount Lemmon Survey ||  || align=right data-sort-value="0.75" | 750 m || 
|-id=295 bgcolor=#d6d6d6
| 522295 ||  || — || October 11, 2007 || Kitt Peak || Spacewatch ||  || align=right | 2.8 km || 
|-id=296 bgcolor=#d6d6d6
| 522296 ||  || — || December 1, 2008 || Mount Lemmon || Mount Lemmon Survey ||  || align=right | 2.6 km || 
|-id=297 bgcolor=#E9E9E9
| 522297 ||  || — || September 17, 2013 || Mount Lemmon || Mount Lemmon Survey ||  || align=right | 2.7 km || 
|-id=298 bgcolor=#d6d6d6
| 522298 ||  || — || October 25, 2013 || Mount Lemmon || Mount Lemmon Survey ||  || align=right | 2.9 km || 
|-id=299 bgcolor=#d6d6d6
| 522299 ||  || — || April 29, 2011 || Mount Lemmon || Mount Lemmon Survey ||  || align=right | 3.0 km || 
|-id=300 bgcolor=#d6d6d6
| 522300 ||  || — || June 5, 2005 || Kitt Peak || Spacewatch ||  || align=right | 3.0 km || 
|}

522301–522400 

|-bgcolor=#d6d6d6
| 522301 ||  || — || March 9, 2011 || Mount Lemmon || Mount Lemmon Survey ||  || align=right | 3.2 km || 
|-id=302 bgcolor=#d6d6d6
| 522302 ||  || — || May 1, 2011 || Haleakala || Pan-STARRS || 7:4 || align=right | 3.7 km || 
|-id=303 bgcolor=#fefefe
| 522303 ||  || — || January 26, 2012 || Mount Lemmon || Mount Lemmon Survey ||  || align=right data-sort-value="0.69" | 690 m || 
|-id=304 bgcolor=#E9E9E9
| 522304 ||  || — || January 18, 2016 || Haleakala || Pan-STARRS ||  || align=right | 1.8 km || 
|-id=305 bgcolor=#fefefe
| 522305 ||  || — || January 1, 2012 || Mount Lemmon || Mount Lemmon Survey ||  || align=right data-sort-value="0.69" | 690 m || 
|-id=306 bgcolor=#E9E9E9
| 522306 ||  || — || December 23, 2014 || Mount Lemmon || Mount Lemmon Survey ||  || align=right | 1.5 km || 
|-id=307 bgcolor=#d6d6d6
| 522307 ||  || — || April 4, 2011 || Kitt Peak || Spacewatch ||  || align=right | 2.5 km || 
|-id=308 bgcolor=#E9E9E9
| 522308 ||  || — || September 1, 2005 || Kitt Peak || Spacewatch ||  || align=right | 1.00 km || 
|-id=309 bgcolor=#fefefe
| 522309 ||  || — || December 19, 2007 || Kitt Peak || Spacewatch ||  || align=right data-sort-value="0.68" | 680 m || 
|-id=310 bgcolor=#E9E9E9
| 522310 ||  || — || April 3, 2008 || Mount Lemmon || Mount Lemmon Survey ||  || align=right data-sort-value="0.81" | 810 m || 
|-id=311 bgcolor=#d6d6d6
| 522311 ||  || — || September 12, 2007 || Kitt Peak || Spacewatch ||  || align=right | 2.5 km || 
|-id=312 bgcolor=#E9E9E9
| 522312 ||  || — || October 8, 2004 || Kitt Peak || Spacewatch ||  || align=right | 2.8 km || 
|-id=313 bgcolor=#E9E9E9
| 522313 ||  || — || March 12, 2008 || Kitt Peak || Spacewatch ||  || align=right data-sort-value="0.83" | 830 m || 
|-id=314 bgcolor=#d6d6d6
| 522314 ||  || — || November 24, 2009 || Kitt Peak || Spacewatch ||  || align=right | 2.0 km || 
|-id=315 bgcolor=#fefefe
| 522315 ||  || — || February 16, 2012 || Haleakala || Pan-STARRS ||  || align=right data-sort-value="0.62" | 620 m || 
|-id=316 bgcolor=#E9E9E9
| 522316 ||  || — || January 10, 2007 || Mount Lemmon || Mount Lemmon Survey ||  || align=right | 1.6 km || 
|-id=317 bgcolor=#E9E9E9
| 522317 ||  || — || August 12, 2013 || Kitt Peak || Spacewatch ||  || align=right | 1.1 km || 
|-id=318 bgcolor=#fefefe
| 522318 ||  || — || October 8, 2007 || Mount Lemmon || Mount Lemmon Survey ||  || align=right data-sort-value="0.53" | 530 m || 
|-id=319 bgcolor=#E9E9E9
| 522319 ||  || — || September 12, 2013 || Mount Lemmon || Mount Lemmon Survey ||  || align=right | 1.6 km || 
|-id=320 bgcolor=#E9E9E9
| 522320 ||  || — || February 4, 2012 || Haleakala || Pan-STARRS ||  || align=right | 1.2 km || 
|-id=321 bgcolor=#d6d6d6
| 522321 ||  || — || October 5, 2008 || La Sagra || OAM Obs. ||  || align=right | 3.7 km || 
|-id=322 bgcolor=#fefefe
| 522322 ||  || — || September 23, 2011 || Kitt Peak || Spacewatch ||  || align=right data-sort-value="0.63" | 630 m || 
|-id=323 bgcolor=#E9E9E9
| 522323 ||  || — || February 29, 2008 || Kitt Peak || Spacewatch || critical || align=right | 1.4 km || 
|-id=324 bgcolor=#E9E9E9
| 522324 ||  || — || July 31, 2014 || Haleakala || Pan-STARRS ||  || align=right | 2.1 km || 
|-id=325 bgcolor=#fefefe
| 522325 ||  || — || November 23, 2011 || Mount Lemmon || Mount Lemmon Survey ||  || align=right data-sort-value="0.60" | 600 m || 
|-id=326 bgcolor=#d6d6d6
| 522326 ||  || — || July 15, 2013 || Haleakala || Pan-STARRS ||  || align=right | 3.1 km || 
|-id=327 bgcolor=#E9E9E9
| 522327 ||  || — || November 1, 2005 || Mount Lemmon || Mount Lemmon Survey ||  || align=right | 1.7 km || 
|-id=328 bgcolor=#E9E9E9
| 522328 ||  || — || March 6, 2008 || Mount Lemmon || Mount Lemmon Survey ||  || align=right data-sort-value="0.77" | 770 m || 
|-id=329 bgcolor=#d6d6d6
| 522329 ||  || — || November 22, 2014 || Haleakala || Pan-STARRS ||  || align=right | 2.8 km || 
|-id=330 bgcolor=#fefefe
| 522330 ||  || — || January 3, 2012 || Mount Lemmon || Mount Lemmon Survey ||  || align=right data-sort-value="0.81" | 810 m || 
|-id=331 bgcolor=#E9E9E9
| 522331 ||  || — || November 28, 2010 || Mount Lemmon || Mount Lemmon Survey ||  || align=right | 1.3 km || 
|-id=332 bgcolor=#d6d6d6
| 522332 ||  || — || December 25, 2005 || Kitt Peak || Spacewatch ||  || align=right | 1.9 km || 
|-id=333 bgcolor=#d6d6d6
| 522333 ||  || — || January 7, 2010 || Kitt Peak || Spacewatch ||  || align=right | 3.7 km || 
|-id=334 bgcolor=#d6d6d6
| 522334 ||  || — || May 8, 2006 || Mount Lemmon || Mount Lemmon Survey ||  || align=right | 2.8 km || 
|-id=335 bgcolor=#fefefe
| 522335 ||  || — || September 17, 2010 || Mount Lemmon || Mount Lemmon Survey ||  || align=right data-sort-value="0.70" | 700 m || 
|-id=336 bgcolor=#fefefe
| 522336 ||  || — || January 24, 2001 || Kitt Peak || Spacewatch ||  || align=right data-sort-value="0.83" | 830 m || 
|-id=337 bgcolor=#fefefe
| 522337 ||  || — || August 4, 2013 || Haleakala || Pan-STARRS ||  || align=right data-sort-value="0.65" | 650 m || 
|-id=338 bgcolor=#E9E9E9
| 522338 ||  || — || January 19, 2012 || Haleakala || Pan-STARRS ||  || align=right | 1.2 km || 
|-id=339 bgcolor=#E9E9E9
| 522339 ||  || — || October 16, 2006 || Kitt Peak || Spacewatch ||  || align=right data-sort-value="0.75" | 750 m || 
|-id=340 bgcolor=#d6d6d6
| 522340 ||  || — || August 24, 2008 || Kitt Peak || Spacewatch ||  || align=right | 2.6 km || 
|-id=341 bgcolor=#E9E9E9
| 522341 ||  || — || January 10, 2007 || Kitt Peak || Spacewatch || critical || align=right | 1.3 km || 
|-id=342 bgcolor=#d6d6d6
| 522342 ||  || — || June 9, 2012 || Mount Lemmon || Mount Lemmon Survey ||  || align=right | 2.4 km || 
|-id=343 bgcolor=#d6d6d6
| 522343 ||  || — || March 31, 2011 || Mount Lemmon || Mount Lemmon Survey ||  || align=right | 2.8 km || 
|-id=344 bgcolor=#E9E9E9
| 522344 ||  || — || October 12, 2009 || Mount Lemmon || Mount Lemmon Survey ||  || align=right | 2.7 km || 
|-id=345 bgcolor=#d6d6d6
| 522345 ||  || — || May 23, 2006 || Kitt Peak || Spacewatch ||  || align=right | 3.2 km || 
|-id=346 bgcolor=#d6d6d6
| 522346 ||  || — || November 9, 2008 || Kitt Peak || Spacewatch ||  || align=right | 3.0 km || 
|-id=347 bgcolor=#E9E9E9
| 522347 ||  || — || December 5, 2010 || Mount Lemmon || Mount Lemmon Survey ||  || align=right data-sort-value="0.82" | 820 m || 
|-id=348 bgcolor=#d6d6d6
| 522348 ||  || — || July 28, 2012 || Haleakala || Pan-STARRS ||  || align=right | 3.4 km || 
|-id=349 bgcolor=#E9E9E9
| 522349 ||  || — || July 14, 2013 || Haleakala || Pan-STARRS ||  || align=right | 1.4 km || 
|-id=350 bgcolor=#E9E9E9
| 522350 ||  || — || December 26, 2006 || Kitt Peak || Spacewatch ||  || align=right | 1.2 km || 
|-id=351 bgcolor=#E9E9E9
| 522351 ||  || — || August 20, 2009 || Kitt Peak || Spacewatch ||  || align=right | 2.0 km || 
|-id=352 bgcolor=#fefefe
| 522352 ||  || — || February 12, 2012 || Mount Lemmon || Mount Lemmon Survey ||  || align=right data-sort-value="0.68" | 680 m || 
|-id=353 bgcolor=#E9E9E9
| 522353 ||  || — || December 15, 2006 || Kitt Peak || Spacewatch ||  || align=right | 1.5 km || 
|-id=354 bgcolor=#fefefe
| 522354 ||  || — || June 7, 2013 || Haleakala || Pan-STARRS ||  || align=right data-sort-value="0.72" | 720 m || 
|-id=355 bgcolor=#d6d6d6
| 522355 ||  || — || September 14, 2007 || Kitt Peak || Spacewatch ||  || align=right | 3.2 km || 
|-id=356 bgcolor=#E9E9E9
| 522356 ||  || — || November 22, 2014 || Haleakala || Pan-STARRS ||  || align=right | 1.8 km || 
|-id=357 bgcolor=#fefefe
| 522357 ||  || — || April 15, 2013 || Haleakala || Pan-STARRS ||  || align=right data-sort-value="0.63" | 630 m || 
|-id=358 bgcolor=#E9E9E9
| 522358 ||  || — || December 3, 2010 || Mount Lemmon || Mount Lemmon Survey ||  || align=right | 1.00 km || 
|-id=359 bgcolor=#fefefe
| 522359 ||  || — || January 20, 2009 || Kitt Peak || Spacewatch ||  || align=right data-sort-value="0.56" | 560 m || 
|-id=360 bgcolor=#d6d6d6
| 522360 ||  || — || July 15, 2013 || Haleakala || Pan-STARRS ||  || align=right | 2.3 km || 
|-id=361 bgcolor=#E9E9E9
| 522361 ||  || — || August 27, 2009 || Kitt Peak || Spacewatch ||  || align=right | 1.4 km || 
|-id=362 bgcolor=#E9E9E9
| 522362 ||  || — || April 1, 2008 || Kitt Peak || Spacewatch ||  || align=right | 1.2 km || 
|-id=363 bgcolor=#E9E9E9
| 522363 ||  || — || August 11, 2008 || La Sagra || OAM Obs. ||  || align=right | 2.1 km || 
|-id=364 bgcolor=#E9E9E9
| 522364 ||  || — || February 25, 2012 || Kitt Peak || Spacewatch ||  || align=right data-sort-value="0.73" | 730 m || 
|-id=365 bgcolor=#d6d6d6
| 522365 ||  || — || February 4, 2005 || Kitt Peak || Spacewatch ||  || align=right | 2.2 km || 
|-id=366 bgcolor=#d6d6d6
| 522366 ||  || — || March 4, 2006 || Kitt Peak || Spacewatch ||  || align=right | 2.0 km || 
|-id=367 bgcolor=#d6d6d6
| 522367 ||  || — || March 5, 2011 || Kitt Peak || Spacewatch ||  || align=right | 2.9 km || 
|-id=368 bgcolor=#d6d6d6
| 522368 ||  || — || August 24, 2007 || Kitt Peak || Spacewatch ||  || align=right | 2.7 km || 
|-id=369 bgcolor=#E9E9E9
| 522369 ||  || — || August 29, 2009 || Kitt Peak || Spacewatch ||  || align=right | 2.9 km || 
|-id=370 bgcolor=#E9E9E9
| 522370 ||  || — || March 16, 2007 || Kitt Peak || Spacewatch ||  || align=right | 2.2 km || 
|-id=371 bgcolor=#fefefe
| 522371 ||  || — || February 4, 2012 || Haleakala || Pan-STARRS ||  || align=right data-sort-value="0.99" | 990 m || 
|-id=372 bgcolor=#E9E9E9
| 522372 ||  || — || February 25, 2007 || Kitt Peak || Spacewatch ||  || align=right | 1.9 km || 
|-id=373 bgcolor=#fefefe
| 522373 ||  || — || July 25, 2006 || Mount Lemmon || Mount Lemmon Survey ||  || align=right data-sort-value="0.87" | 870 m || 
|-id=374 bgcolor=#E9E9E9
| 522374 ||  || — || February 10, 2008 || Mount Lemmon || Mount Lemmon Survey ||  || align=right data-sort-value="0.87" | 870 m || 
|-id=375 bgcolor=#fefefe
| 522375 ||  || — || November 25, 2014 || Mount Lemmon || Mount Lemmon Survey ||  || align=right data-sort-value="0.97" | 970 m || 
|-id=376 bgcolor=#fefefe
| 522376 ||  || — || February 27, 2009 || Kitt Peak || Spacewatch ||  || align=right data-sort-value="0.60" | 600 m || 
|-id=377 bgcolor=#d6d6d6
| 522377 ||  || — || February 4, 2005 || Mount Lemmon || Mount Lemmon Survey ||  || align=right | 2.6 km || 
|-id=378 bgcolor=#E9E9E9
| 522378 ||  || — || April 27, 2012 || Haleakala || Pan-STARRS ||  || align=right data-sort-value="0.89" | 890 m || 
|-id=379 bgcolor=#d6d6d6
| 522379 ||  || — || May 26, 2011 || Mount Lemmon || Mount Lemmon Survey ||  || align=right | 2.9 km || 
|-id=380 bgcolor=#d6d6d6
| 522380 ||  || — || May 21, 2006 || Kitt Peak || Spacewatch ||  || align=right | 2.9 km || 
|-id=381 bgcolor=#E9E9E9
| 522381 ||  || — || September 1, 2013 || Catalina || CSS ||  || align=right | 1.6 km || 
|-id=382 bgcolor=#E9E9E9
| 522382 ||  || — || March 31, 2008 || Kitt Peak || Spacewatch ||  || align=right | 1.0 km || 
|-id=383 bgcolor=#fefefe
| 522383 ||  || — || November 16, 2006 || Kitt Peak || Spacewatch ||  || align=right | 1.1 km || 
|-id=384 bgcolor=#E9E9E9
| 522384 ||  || — || May 13, 2012 || Mount Lemmon || Mount Lemmon Survey ||  || align=right | 1.1 km || 
|-id=385 bgcolor=#E9E9E9
| 522385 ||  || — || January 2, 2011 || Mount Lemmon || Mount Lemmon Survey ||  || align=right data-sort-value="0.98" | 980 m || 
|-id=386 bgcolor=#E9E9E9
| 522386 ||  || — || March 11, 2008 || Kitt Peak || Spacewatch ||  || align=right data-sort-value="0.73" | 730 m || 
|-id=387 bgcolor=#fefefe
| 522387 ||  || — || October 26, 2011 || Haleakala || Pan-STARRS ||  || align=right data-sort-value="0.56" | 560 m || 
|-id=388 bgcolor=#fefefe
| 522388 ||  || — || October 28, 2014 || Haleakala || Pan-STARRS ||  || align=right data-sort-value="0.72" | 720 m || 
|-id=389 bgcolor=#fefefe
| 522389 ||  || — || March 31, 2009 || Kitt Peak || Spacewatch ||  || align=right data-sort-value="0.62" | 620 m || 
|-id=390 bgcolor=#E9E9E9
| 522390 ||  || — || June 20, 2013 || Mount Lemmon || Mount Lemmon Survey ||  || align=right data-sort-value="0.93" | 930 m || 
|-id=391 bgcolor=#fefefe
| 522391 ||  || — || September 2, 2010 || Mount Lemmon || Mount Lemmon Survey ||  || align=right data-sort-value="0.83" | 830 m || 
|-id=392 bgcolor=#d6d6d6
| 522392 ||  || — || August 14, 2013 || Haleakala || Pan-STARRS ||  || align=right | 2.2 km || 
|-id=393 bgcolor=#E9E9E9
| 522393 ||  || — || March 24, 2012 || Kitt Peak || Spacewatch ||  || align=right | 1.1 km || 
|-id=394 bgcolor=#d6d6d6
| 522394 ||  || — || October 26, 2009 || Mount Lemmon || Mount Lemmon Survey ||  || align=right | 2.2 km || 
|-id=395 bgcolor=#d6d6d6
| 522395 ||  || — || March 11, 2011 || Kitt Peak || Spacewatch ||  || align=right | 3.0 km || 
|-id=396 bgcolor=#d6d6d6
| 522396 ||  || — || April 6, 2011 || Mount Lemmon || Mount Lemmon Survey ||  || align=right | 2.8 km || 
|-id=397 bgcolor=#E9E9E9
| 522397 ||  || — || February 7, 2011 || Mount Lemmon || Mount Lemmon Survey ||  || align=right | 1.9 km || 
|-id=398 bgcolor=#E9E9E9
| 522398 ||  || — || March 26, 2004 || Kitt Peak || Spacewatch ||  || align=right | 1.2 km || 
|-id=399 bgcolor=#E9E9E9
| 522399 ||  || — || February 25, 2012 || Kitt Peak || Spacewatch ||  || align=right data-sort-value="0.85" | 850 m || 
|-id=400 bgcolor=#fefefe
| 522400 ||  || — || December 31, 2011 || Kitt Peak || Spacewatch ||  || align=right data-sort-value="0.71" | 710 m || 
|}

522401–522500 

|-bgcolor=#d6d6d6
| 522401 ||  || — || June 17, 2012 || Kitt Peak || Spacewatch ||  || align=right | 3.0 km || 
|-id=402 bgcolor=#E9E9E9
| 522402 ||  || — || December 25, 2005 || Mount Lemmon || Mount Lemmon Survey ||  || align=right | 2.5 km || 
|-id=403 bgcolor=#E9E9E9
| 522403 ||  || — || September 24, 1995 || Kitt Peak || Spacewatch ||  || align=right | 1.8 km || 
|-id=404 bgcolor=#E9E9E9
| 522404 ||  || — || February 23, 2007 || Kitt Peak || Spacewatch ||  || align=right | 2.0 km || 
|-id=405 bgcolor=#E9E9E9
| 522405 ||  || — || August 28, 2005 || Kitt Peak || Spacewatch ||  || align=right | 1.4 km || 
|-id=406 bgcolor=#d6d6d6
| 522406 ||  || — || September 20, 2014 || Haleakala || Pan-STARRS ||  || align=right | 2.2 km || 
|-id=407 bgcolor=#E9E9E9
| 522407 ||  || — || January 2, 2011 || Mount Lemmon || Mount Lemmon Survey ||  || align=right | 1.8 km || 
|-id=408 bgcolor=#E9E9E9
| 522408 ||  || — || February 27, 2012 || Haleakala || Pan-STARRS ||  || align=right data-sort-value="0.86" | 860 m || 
|-id=409 bgcolor=#d6d6d6
| 522409 ||  || — || October 7, 2004 || Kitt Peak || Spacewatch ||  || align=right | 1.9 km || 
|-id=410 bgcolor=#E9E9E9
| 522410 ||  || — || March 11, 2008 || Kitt Peak || Spacewatch ||  || align=right data-sort-value="0.86" | 860 m || 
|-id=411 bgcolor=#d6d6d6
| 522411 ||  || — || September 24, 2008 || Kitt Peak || Spacewatch ||  || align=right | 3.3 km || 
|-id=412 bgcolor=#d6d6d6
| 522412 ||  || — || October 11, 2007 || Kitt Peak || Spacewatch || 7:4 || align=right | 2.9 km || 
|-id=413 bgcolor=#E9E9E9
| 522413 ||  || — || January 30, 2011 || Haleakala || Pan-STARRS ||  || align=right | 1.7 km || 
|-id=414 bgcolor=#d6d6d6
| 522414 ||  || — || September 23, 2008 || Kitt Peak || Spacewatch ||  || align=right | 2.6 km || 
|-id=415 bgcolor=#E9E9E9
| 522415 ||  || — || September 14, 2013 || Kitt Peak || Spacewatch ||  || align=right | 1.3 km || 
|-id=416 bgcolor=#E9E9E9
| 522416 ||  || — || October 25, 2005 || Kitt Peak || Spacewatch ||  || align=right | 1.4 km || 
|-id=417 bgcolor=#E9E9E9
| 522417 ||  || — || April 29, 2012 || Kitt Peak || Spacewatch ||  || align=right | 2.0 km || 
|-id=418 bgcolor=#d6d6d6
| 522418 ||  || — || October 5, 2013 || Haleakala || Pan-STARRS ||  || align=right | 2.6 km || 
|-id=419 bgcolor=#d6d6d6
| 522419 ||  || — || September 11, 2007 || Mount Lemmon || Mount Lemmon Survey ||  || align=right | 3.1 km || 
|-id=420 bgcolor=#d6d6d6
| 522420 ||  || — || October 27, 2008 || Mount Lemmon || Mount Lemmon Survey ||  || align=right | 2.4 km || 
|-id=421 bgcolor=#E9E9E9
| 522421 ||  || — || January 9, 2006 || Kitt Peak || Spacewatch ||  || align=right | 2.2 km || 
|-id=422 bgcolor=#d6d6d6
| 522422 ||  || — || September 13, 2007 || Mount Lemmon || Mount Lemmon Survey ||  || align=right | 2.5 km || 
|-id=423 bgcolor=#d6d6d6
| 522423 ||  || — || February 19, 2015 || Haleakala || Pan-STARRS ||  || align=right | 2.4 km || 
|-id=424 bgcolor=#E9E9E9
| 522424 ||  || — || January 8, 2011 || Mount Lemmon || Mount Lemmon Survey ||  || align=right | 1.2 km || 
|-id=425 bgcolor=#E9E9E9
| 522425 ||  || — || January 30, 2011 || Haleakala || Pan-STARRS ||  || align=right | 1.4 km || 
|-id=426 bgcolor=#E9E9E9
| 522426 ||  || — || December 21, 2014 || Haleakala || Pan-STARRS ||  || align=right | 1.6 km || 
|-id=427 bgcolor=#d6d6d6
| 522427 ||  || — || April 29, 2006 || Kitt Peak || Spacewatch ||  || align=right | 2.2 km || 
|-id=428 bgcolor=#fefefe
| 522428 ||  || — || January 14, 2012 || Kitt Peak || Spacewatch ||  || align=right data-sort-value="0.74" | 740 m || 
|-id=429 bgcolor=#fefefe
| 522429 ||  || — || January 1, 2008 || Kitt Peak || Spacewatch ||  || align=right data-sort-value="0.79" | 790 m || 
|-id=430 bgcolor=#E9E9E9
| 522430 ||  || — || November 25, 2009 || Mount Lemmon || Mount Lemmon Survey ||  || align=right | 2.8 km || 
|-id=431 bgcolor=#d6d6d6
| 522431 ||  || — || January 1, 2009 || Kitt Peak || Spacewatch ||  || align=right | 3.3 km || 
|-id=432 bgcolor=#d6d6d6
| 522432 ||  || — || February 13, 2011 || Mount Lemmon || Mount Lemmon Survey ||  || align=right | 1.9 km || 
|-id=433 bgcolor=#E9E9E9
| 522433 ||  || — || December 12, 2006 || Kitt Peak || Spacewatch ||  || align=right data-sort-value="0.97" | 970 m || 
|-id=434 bgcolor=#d6d6d6
| 522434 ||  || — || October 7, 2008 || Kitt Peak || Spacewatch ||  || align=right | 2.0 km || 
|-id=435 bgcolor=#d6d6d6
| 522435 ||  || — || February 20, 2006 || Kitt Peak || Spacewatch ||  || align=right | 1.9 km || 
|-id=436 bgcolor=#E9E9E9
| 522436 ||  || — || April 22, 2012 || Kitt Peak || Spacewatch ||  || align=right | 2.3 km || 
|-id=437 bgcolor=#E9E9E9
| 522437 ||  || — || March 2, 2011 || Catalina || CSS ||  || align=right | 2.3 km || 
|-id=438 bgcolor=#E9E9E9
| 522438 ||  || — || December 1, 2014 || Haleakala || Pan-STARRS ||  || align=right | 1.9 km || 
|-id=439 bgcolor=#E9E9E9
| 522439 ||  || — || April 14, 2008 || Mount Lemmon || Mount Lemmon Survey ||  || align=right data-sort-value="0.91" | 910 m || 
|-id=440 bgcolor=#E9E9E9
| 522440 ||  || — || October 27, 2005 || Kitt Peak || Spacewatch ||  || align=right | 1.0 km || 
|-id=441 bgcolor=#E9E9E9
| 522441 ||  || — || April 1, 2008 || Kitt Peak || Spacewatch ||  || align=right data-sort-value="0.69" | 690 m || 
|-id=442 bgcolor=#E9E9E9
| 522442 ||  || — || January 12, 2011 || Kitt Peak || Spacewatch ||  || align=right | 1.5 km || 
|-id=443 bgcolor=#E9E9E9
| 522443 ||  || — || May 29, 2008 || Kitt Peak || Spacewatch ||  || align=right data-sort-value="0.97" | 970 m || 
|-id=444 bgcolor=#d6d6d6
| 522444 ||  || — || November 1, 2013 || Mount Lemmon || Mount Lemmon Survey ||  || align=right | 3.1 km || 
|-id=445 bgcolor=#E9E9E9
| 522445 ||  || — || December 11, 2010 || Mount Lemmon || Mount Lemmon Survey ||  || align=right | 1.8 km || 
|-id=446 bgcolor=#d6d6d6
| 522446 ||  || — || March 26, 2011 || Mount Lemmon || Mount Lemmon Survey ||  || align=right | 2.0 km || 
|-id=447 bgcolor=#d6d6d6
| 522447 ||  || — || November 27, 2014 || Mount Lemmon || Mount Lemmon Survey ||  || align=right | 2.7 km || 
|-id=448 bgcolor=#E9E9E9
| 522448 ||  || — || September 6, 2008 || Mount Lemmon || Mount Lemmon Survey ||  || align=right | 1.7 km || 
|-id=449 bgcolor=#fefefe
| 522449 ||  || — || December 31, 2007 || Mount Lemmon || Mount Lemmon Survey ||  || align=right data-sort-value="0.95" | 950 m || 
|-id=450 bgcolor=#E9E9E9
| 522450 ||  || — || December 13, 2010 || Kitt Peak || Spacewatch ||  || align=right data-sort-value="0.95" | 950 m || 
|-id=451 bgcolor=#d6d6d6
| 522451 ||  || — || November 1, 1999 || Kitt Peak || Spacewatch ||  || align=right | 2.4 km || 
|-id=452 bgcolor=#d6d6d6
| 522452 ||  || — || May 10, 2011 || Mount Lemmon || Mount Lemmon Survey ||  || align=right | 2.3 km || 
|-id=453 bgcolor=#d6d6d6
| 522453 ||  || — || November 20, 2008 || Kitt Peak || Spacewatch ||  || align=right | 2.7 km || 
|-id=454 bgcolor=#d6d6d6
| 522454 ||  || — || October 14, 2001 || Cima Ekar || ADAS ||  || align=right | 3.4 km || 
|-id=455 bgcolor=#E9E9E9
| 522455 ||  || — || December 1, 2005 || Mount Lemmon || Mount Lemmon Survey ||  || align=right | 1.5 km || 
|-id=456 bgcolor=#E9E9E9
| 522456 ||  || — || September 6, 2013 || Kitt Peak || Spacewatch ||  || align=right | 1.2 km || 
|-id=457 bgcolor=#d6d6d6
| 522457 ||  || — || September 25, 2012 || Kitt Peak || Spacewatch ||  || align=right | 3.1 km || 
|-id=458 bgcolor=#d6d6d6
| 522458 ||  || — || April 27, 2011 || Mount Lemmon || Mount Lemmon Survey ||  || align=right | 2.8 km || 
|-id=459 bgcolor=#d6d6d6
| 522459 ||  || — || May 24, 2011 || Mount Lemmon || Mount Lemmon Survey ||  || align=right | 2.7 km || 
|-id=460 bgcolor=#E9E9E9
| 522460 ||  || — || November 17, 2014 || Haleakala || Pan-STARRS ||  || align=right | 1.9 km || 
|-id=461 bgcolor=#E9E9E9
| 522461 ||  || — || December 7, 2005 || Kitt Peak || Spacewatch ||  || align=right | 2.7 km || 
|-id=462 bgcolor=#d6d6d6
| 522462 ||  || — || November 30, 2014 || Haleakala || Pan-STARRS ||  || align=right | 2.6 km || 
|-id=463 bgcolor=#E9E9E9
| 522463 ||  || — || July 15, 2013 || Haleakala || Pan-STARRS ||  || align=right data-sort-value="0.88" | 880 m || 
|-id=464 bgcolor=#E9E9E9
| 522464 ||  || — || February 12, 2016 || Haleakala || Pan-STARRS ||  || align=right | 1.4 km || 
|-id=465 bgcolor=#d6d6d6
| 522465 ||  || — || September 6, 2012 || Mount Lemmon || Mount Lemmon Survey ||  || align=right | 2.9 km || 
|-id=466 bgcolor=#E9E9E9
| 522466 Auyeung ||  ||  || February 19, 2010 || WISE || WISE ||  || align=right | 2.5 km || 
|-id=467 bgcolor=#E9E9E9
| 522467 ||  || — || March 27, 2003 || Kitt Peak || Spacewatch ||  || align=right | 1.3 km || 
|-id=468 bgcolor=#E9E9E9
| 522468 ||  || — || April 22, 2007 || Mount Lemmon || Mount Lemmon Survey ||  || align=right | 2.2 km || 
|-id=469 bgcolor=#E9E9E9
| 522469 ||  || — || November 17, 2014 || Haleakala || Pan-STARRS ||  || align=right | 1.2 km || 
|-id=470 bgcolor=#E9E9E9
| 522470 ||  || — || November 10, 2009 || Kitt Peak || Spacewatch ||  || align=right | 3.1 km || 
|-id=471 bgcolor=#E9E9E9
| 522471 ||  || — || August 30, 2005 || Kitt Peak || Spacewatch ||  || align=right | 1.6 km || 
|-id=472 bgcolor=#fefefe
| 522472 ||  || — || October 16, 2007 || Mount Lemmon || Mount Lemmon Survey ||  || align=right data-sort-value="0.71" | 710 m || 
|-id=473 bgcolor=#E9E9E9
| 522473 ||  || — || October 27, 2009 || Mount Lemmon || Mount Lemmon Survey ||  || align=right | 3.1 km || 
|-id=474 bgcolor=#E9E9E9
| 522474 ||  || — || April 15, 2012 || Haleakala || Pan-STARRS ||  || align=right | 1.7 km || 
|-id=475 bgcolor=#E9E9E9
| 522475 ||  || — || February 6, 2007 || Kitt Peak || Spacewatch ||  || align=right | 1.2 km || 
|-id=476 bgcolor=#fefefe
| 522476 ||  || — || February 3, 2012 || Haleakala || Pan-STARRS ||  || align=right data-sort-value="0.67" | 670 m || 
|-id=477 bgcolor=#d6d6d6
| 522477 ||  || — || July 29, 2008 || Kitt Peak || Spacewatch ||  || align=right | 2.2 km || 
|-id=478 bgcolor=#E9E9E9
| 522478 ||  || — || April 15, 2008 || Kitt Peak || Spacewatch ||  || align=right data-sort-value="0.67" | 670 m || 
|-id=479 bgcolor=#d6d6d6
| 522479 ||  || — || April 1, 2005 || Kitt Peak || Spacewatch ||  || align=right | 3.2 km || 
|-id=480 bgcolor=#d6d6d6
| 522480 ||  || — || April 7, 2011 || Kitt Peak || Spacewatch ||  || align=right | 2.6 km || 
|-id=481 bgcolor=#d6d6d6
| 522481 ||  || — || July 29, 2008 || Kitt Peak || Spacewatch ||  || align=right | 2.2 km || 
|-id=482 bgcolor=#d6d6d6
| 522482 ||  || — || March 14, 2011 || Mount Lemmon || Mount Lemmon Survey ||  || align=right | 3.3 km || 
|-id=483 bgcolor=#d6d6d6
| 522483 ||  || — || July 3, 2011 || Mount Lemmon || Mount Lemmon Survey ||  || align=right | 2.8 km || 
|-id=484 bgcolor=#E9E9E9
| 522484 ||  || — || March 26, 2007 || Mount Lemmon || Mount Lemmon Survey ||  || align=right | 1.4 km || 
|-id=485 bgcolor=#d6d6d6
| 522485 ||  || — || September 23, 2008 || Siding Spring || SSS ||  || align=right | 3.0 km || 
|-id=486 bgcolor=#d6d6d6
| 522486 ||  || — || March 4, 2011 || Mount Lemmon || Mount Lemmon Survey ||  || align=right | 2.1 km || 
|-id=487 bgcolor=#E9E9E9
| 522487 ||  || — || April 27, 2012 || Haleakala || Pan-STARRS ||  || align=right | 1.8 km || 
|-id=488 bgcolor=#E9E9E9
| 522488 ||  || — || May 15, 2012 || Haleakala || Pan-STARRS ||  || align=right | 2.0 km || 
|-id=489 bgcolor=#E9E9E9
| 522489 ||  || — || October 29, 2010 || Mount Lemmon || Mount Lemmon Survey ||  || align=right data-sort-value="0.94" | 940 m || 
|-id=490 bgcolor=#E9E9E9
| 522490 ||  || — || December 28, 2005 || Kitt Peak || Spacewatch ||  || align=right | 2.1 km || 
|-id=491 bgcolor=#E9E9E9
| 522491 ||  || — || March 2, 2016 || Haleakala || Pan-STARRS ||  || align=right | 2.2 km || 
|-id=492 bgcolor=#fefefe
| 522492 ||  || — || October 28, 2014 || Haleakala || Pan-STARRS ||  || align=right data-sort-value="0.67" | 670 m || 
|-id=493 bgcolor=#d6d6d6
| 522493 ||  || — || April 26, 2011 || Mount Lemmon || Mount Lemmon Survey ||  || align=right | 3.6 km || 
|-id=494 bgcolor=#E9E9E9
| 522494 ||  || — || November 21, 2014 || Haleakala || Pan-STARRS ||  || align=right | 1.0 km || 
|-id=495 bgcolor=#d6d6d6
| 522495 ||  || — || February 14, 2010 || Mount Lemmon || Mount Lemmon Survey ||  || align=right | 2.8 km || 
|-id=496 bgcolor=#E9E9E9
| 522496 ||  || — || February 23, 2012 || Kitt Peak || Spacewatch ||  || align=right | 2.0 km || 
|-id=497 bgcolor=#E9E9E9
| 522497 ||  || — || November 17, 2014 || Haleakala || Pan-STARRS ||  || align=right | 1.5 km || 
|-id=498 bgcolor=#d6d6d6
| 522498 ||  || — || January 16, 2015 || Haleakala || Pan-STARRS ||  || align=right | 2.9 km || 
|-id=499 bgcolor=#E9E9E9
| 522499 ||  || — || November 14, 2010 || Kitt Peak || Spacewatch ||  || align=right data-sort-value="0.68" | 680 m || 
|-id=500 bgcolor=#E9E9E9
| 522500 ||  || — || September 25, 2005 || Kitt Peak || Spacewatch ||  || align=right data-sort-value="0.90" | 900 m || 
|}

522501–522600 

|-bgcolor=#d6d6d6
| 522501 ||  || — || October 18, 2007 || Mount Lemmon || Mount Lemmon Survey ||  || align=right | 2.5 km || 
|-id=502 bgcolor=#E9E9E9
| 522502 ||  || — || March 14, 2011 || Mount Lemmon || Mount Lemmon Survey ||  || align=right | 2.0 km || 
|-id=503 bgcolor=#d6d6d6
| 522503 ||  || — || March 17, 2005 || Kitt Peak || Spacewatch ||  || align=right | 2.5 km || 
|-id=504 bgcolor=#d6d6d6
| 522504 ||  || — || April 7, 2011 || Kitt Peak || Spacewatch ||  || align=right | 1.9 km || 
|-id=505 bgcolor=#E9E9E9
| 522505 ||  || — || March 26, 2007 || Kitt Peak || Spacewatch ||  || align=right | 2.1 km || 
|-id=506 bgcolor=#E9E9E9
| 522506 ||  || — || September 7, 2004 || Kitt Peak || Spacewatch ||  || align=right | 2.2 km || 
|-id=507 bgcolor=#E9E9E9
| 522507 ||  || — || December 13, 2006 || Kitt Peak || Spacewatch ||  || align=right | 1.0 km || 
|-id=508 bgcolor=#d6d6d6
| 522508 ||  || — || September 14, 2007 || Mount Lemmon || Mount Lemmon Survey ||  || align=right | 2.3 km || 
|-id=509 bgcolor=#d6d6d6
| 522509 ||  || — || September 23, 2008 || Mount Lemmon || Mount Lemmon Survey ||  || align=right | 2.8 km || 
|-id=510 bgcolor=#E9E9E9
| 522510 ||  || — || October 4, 2004 || Kitt Peak || Spacewatch ||  || align=right | 2.3 km || 
|-id=511 bgcolor=#fefefe
| 522511 ||  || — || June 4, 2005 || Kitt Peak || Spacewatch ||  || align=right data-sort-value="0.74" | 740 m || 
|-id=512 bgcolor=#E9E9E9
| 522512 ||  || — || May 7, 2008 || Kitt Peak || Spacewatch ||  || align=right data-sort-value="0.74" | 740 m || 
|-id=513 bgcolor=#d6d6d6
| 522513 ||  || — || October 25, 2013 || Mount Lemmon || Mount Lemmon Survey ||  || align=right | 2.4 km || 
|-id=514 bgcolor=#E9E9E9
| 522514 ||  || — || January 29, 2011 || Mount Lemmon || Mount Lemmon Survey ||  || align=right data-sort-value="0.82" | 820 m || 
|-id=515 bgcolor=#d6d6d6
| 522515 ||  || — || January 18, 2015 || Mount Lemmon || Mount Lemmon Survey ||  || align=right | 2.8 km || 
|-id=516 bgcolor=#fefefe
| 522516 ||  || — || February 25, 2012 || Kitt Peak || Spacewatch ||  || align=right data-sort-value="0.75" | 750 m || 
|-id=517 bgcolor=#fefefe
| 522517 ||  || — || February 10, 2008 || Kitt Peak || Spacewatch ||  || align=right data-sort-value="0.89" | 890 m || 
|-id=518 bgcolor=#fefefe
| 522518 ||  || — || March 16, 2012 || Mount Lemmon || Mount Lemmon Survey ||  || align=right data-sort-value="0.78" | 780 m || 
|-id=519 bgcolor=#E9E9E9
| 522519 ||  || — || April 23, 2007 || Mount Lemmon || Mount Lemmon Survey ||  || align=right | 1.7 km || 
|-id=520 bgcolor=#d6d6d6
| 522520 ||  || — || October 3, 2008 || Mount Lemmon || Mount Lemmon Survey ||  || align=right | 2.6 km || 
|-id=521 bgcolor=#E9E9E9
| 522521 ||  || — || December 10, 2005 || Kitt Peak || Spacewatch ||  || align=right | 1.3 km || 
|-id=522 bgcolor=#d6d6d6
| 522522 ||  || — || February 14, 2010 || Kitt Peak || Spacewatch ||  || align=right | 2.1 km || 
|-id=523 bgcolor=#fefefe
| 522523 ||  || — || November 9, 2007 || Kitt Peak || Spacewatch ||  || align=right data-sort-value="0.64" | 640 m || 
|-id=524 bgcolor=#d6d6d6
| 522524 ||  || — || January 20, 2015 || Haleakala || Pan-STARRS ||  || align=right | 2.3 km || 
|-id=525 bgcolor=#d6d6d6
| 522525 ||  || — || December 26, 2014 || Haleakala || Pan-STARRS ||  || align=right | 2.9 km || 
|-id=526 bgcolor=#d6d6d6
| 522526 ||  || — || December 29, 2014 || Haleakala || Pan-STARRS ||  || align=right | 2.3 km || 
|-id=527 bgcolor=#E9E9E9
| 522527 ||  || — || January 17, 2015 || Haleakala || Pan-STARRS ||  || align=right | 1.7 km || 
|-id=528 bgcolor=#d6d6d6
| 522528 ||  || — || May 13, 2011 || Mount Lemmon || Mount Lemmon Survey ||  || align=right | 2.6 km || 
|-id=529 bgcolor=#d6d6d6
| 522529 ||  || — || January 19, 2015 || Haleakala || Pan-STARRS ||  || align=right | 2.4 km || 
|-id=530 bgcolor=#d6d6d6
| 522530 ||  || — || November 6, 2013 || Haleakala || Pan-STARRS ||  || align=right | 2.6 km || 
|-id=531 bgcolor=#E9E9E9
| 522531 ||  || — || June 8, 2012 || Mount Lemmon || Mount Lemmon Survey ||  || align=right | 1.5 km || 
|-id=532 bgcolor=#fefefe
| 522532 ||  || — || March 30, 2012 || Mount Lemmon || Mount Lemmon Survey ||  || align=right data-sort-value="0.86" | 860 m || 
|-id=533 bgcolor=#E9E9E9
| 522533 ||  || — || August 22, 2004 || Kitt Peak || Spacewatch ||  || align=right | 1.2 km || 
|-id=534 bgcolor=#d6d6d6
| 522534 ||  || — || March 8, 2005 || Mount Lemmon || Mount Lemmon Survey ||  || align=right | 2.2 km || 
|-id=535 bgcolor=#d6d6d6
| 522535 ||  || — || August 23, 2007 || Kitt Peak || Spacewatch ||  || align=right | 2.7 km || 
|-id=536 bgcolor=#d6d6d6
| 522536 ||  || — || January 6, 2010 || Kitt Peak || Spacewatch ||  || align=right | 2.8 km || 
|-id=537 bgcolor=#d6d6d6
| 522537 ||  || — || January 6, 2010 || Mount Lemmon || Mount Lemmon Survey ||  || align=right | 2.2 km || 
|-id=538 bgcolor=#fefefe
| 522538 ||  || — || December 22, 2008 || Kitt Peak || Spacewatch ||  || align=right data-sort-value="0.65" | 650 m || 
|-id=539 bgcolor=#d6d6d6
| 522539 ||  || — || January 11, 2010 || Mount Lemmon || Mount Lemmon Survey ||  || align=right | 2.9 km || 
|-id=540 bgcolor=#d6d6d6
| 522540 ||  || — || October 9, 2013 || Catalina || CSS ||  || align=right | 2.6 km || 
|-id=541 bgcolor=#E9E9E9
| 522541 ||  || — || January 14, 2011 || Kitt Peak || Spacewatch ||  || align=right | 1.5 km || 
|-id=542 bgcolor=#E9E9E9
| 522542 ||  || — || December 5, 2010 || Mount Lemmon || Mount Lemmon Survey ||  || align=right | 1.5 km || 
|-id=543 bgcolor=#fefefe
| 522543 ||  || — || February 26, 2012 || Mount Lemmon || Mount Lemmon Survey ||  || align=right data-sort-value="0.91" | 910 m || 
|-id=544 bgcolor=#d6d6d6
| 522544 ||  || — || June 7, 2011 || Mount Lemmon || Mount Lemmon Survey ||  || align=right | 2.4 km || 
|-id=545 bgcolor=#d6d6d6
| 522545 ||  || — || May 2, 2005 || Kitt Peak || Spacewatch ||  || align=right | 2.2 km || 
|-id=546 bgcolor=#E9E9E9
| 522546 ||  || — || March 7, 2016 || Haleakala || Pan-STARRS ||  || align=right data-sort-value="0.88" | 880 m || 
|-id=547 bgcolor=#E9E9E9
| 522547 ||  || — || May 27, 2012 || Mount Lemmon || Mount Lemmon Survey ||  || align=right data-sort-value="0.83" | 830 m || 
|-id=548 bgcolor=#E9E9E9
| 522548 ||  || — || January 30, 2011 || Haleakala || Pan-STARRS ||  || align=right | 1.3 km || 
|-id=549 bgcolor=#E9E9E9
| 522549 ||  || — || January 17, 2016 || Haleakala || Pan-STARRS ||  || align=right | 1.2 km || 
|-id=550 bgcolor=#E9E9E9
| 522550 ||  || — || December 12, 2014 || Haleakala || Pan-STARRS ||  || align=right data-sort-value="0.94" | 940 m || 
|-id=551 bgcolor=#d6d6d6
| 522551 ||  || — || January 8, 2010 || Kitt Peak || Spacewatch ||  || align=right | 2.5 km || 
|-id=552 bgcolor=#d6d6d6
| 522552 ||  || — || August 17, 2012 || Haleakala || Pan-STARRS ||  || align=right | 2.2 km || 
|-id=553 bgcolor=#E9E9E9
| 522553 ||  || — || March 16, 2012 || Mount Lemmon || Mount Lemmon Survey ||  || align=right data-sort-value="0.83" | 830 m || 
|-id=554 bgcolor=#E9E9E9
| 522554 ||  || — || September 13, 2005 || Kitt Peak || Spacewatch ||  || align=right data-sort-value="0.78" | 780 m || 
|-id=555 bgcolor=#d6d6d6
| 522555 ||  || — || September 3, 2013 || Haleakala || Pan-STARRS ||  || align=right | 1.9 km || 
|-id=556 bgcolor=#E9E9E9
| 522556 ||  || — || April 29, 2012 || Kitt Peak || Spacewatch ||  || align=right | 2.0 km || 
|-id=557 bgcolor=#d6d6d6
| 522557 ||  || — || November 26, 2009 || Kitt Peak || Spacewatch ||  || align=right | 2.3 km || 
|-id=558 bgcolor=#E9E9E9
| 522558 ||  || — || October 7, 2005 || Catalina || CSS ||  || align=right | 1.4 km || 
|-id=559 bgcolor=#E9E9E9
| 522559 ||  || — || January 25, 2006 || Kitt Peak || Spacewatch ||  || align=right | 1.9 km || 
|-id=560 bgcolor=#E9E9E9
| 522560 ||  || — || January 16, 2011 || Mount Lemmon || Mount Lemmon Survey ||  || align=right | 1.1 km || 
|-id=561 bgcolor=#fefefe
| 522561 ||  || — || February 15, 2012 || Haleakala || Pan-STARRS ||  || align=right data-sort-value="0.68" | 680 m || 
|-id=562 bgcolor=#E9E9E9
| 522562 ||  || — || February 2, 2006 || Kitt Peak || Spacewatch ||  || align=right | 1.8 km || 
|-id=563 bgcolor=#E9E9E9
| 522563 Randyflynn ||  ||  || December 6, 2010 || Mount Lemmon || Mount Lemmon Survey ||  || align=right | 1.2 km || 
|-id=564 bgcolor=#fefefe
| 522564 ||  || — || March 21, 2012 || Mount Lemmon || Mount Lemmon Survey ||  || align=right data-sort-value="0.61" | 610 m || 
|-id=565 bgcolor=#d6d6d6
| 522565 ||  || — || September 4, 2008 || Kitt Peak || Spacewatch ||  || align=right | 2.1 km || 
|-id=566 bgcolor=#d6d6d6
| 522566 ||  || — || May 8, 2005 || Kitt Peak || Spacewatch ||  || align=right | 2.8 km || 
|-id=567 bgcolor=#E9E9E9
| 522567 ||  || — || September 21, 2003 || Anderson Mesa || LONEOS ||  || align=right | 2.2 km || 
|-id=568 bgcolor=#E9E9E9
| 522568 ||  || — || October 5, 2013 || Haleakala || Pan-STARRS ||  || align=right | 2.0 km || 
|-id=569 bgcolor=#fefefe
| 522569 ||  || — || June 18, 2013 || Haleakala || Pan-STARRS ||  || align=right data-sort-value="0.80" | 800 m || 
|-id=570 bgcolor=#fefefe
| 522570 ||  || — || March 3, 2009 || Kitt Peak || Spacewatch ||  || align=right data-sort-value="0.68" | 680 m || 
|-id=571 bgcolor=#E9E9E9
| 522571 ||  || — || September 27, 2009 || Kitt Peak || Spacewatch ||  || align=right | 1.5 km || 
|-id=572 bgcolor=#d6d6d6
| 522572 ||  || — || September 4, 2007 || Mount Lemmon || Mount Lemmon Survey ||  || align=right | 2.6 km || 
|-id=573 bgcolor=#E9E9E9
| 522573 ||  || — || December 14, 2010 || Mount Lemmon || Mount Lemmon Survey ||  || align=right | 2.3 km || 
|-id=574 bgcolor=#fefefe
| 522574 ||  || — || January 21, 2012 || Haleakala || Pan-STARRS ||  || align=right data-sort-value="0.89" | 890 m || 
|-id=575 bgcolor=#E9E9E9
| 522575 ||  || — || December 10, 2005 || Kitt Peak || Spacewatch ||  || align=right | 2.8 km || 
|-id=576 bgcolor=#E9E9E9
| 522576 ||  || — || January 30, 2011 || Haleakala || Pan-STARRS ||  || align=right | 1.9 km || 
|-id=577 bgcolor=#d6d6d6
| 522577 ||  || — || September 14, 2013 || Haleakala || Pan-STARRS ||  || align=right | 2.5 km || 
|-id=578 bgcolor=#E9E9E9
| 522578 ||  || — || January 28, 2011 || Kitt Peak || Spacewatch ||  || align=right | 2.2 km || 
|-id=579 bgcolor=#E9E9E9
| 522579 ||  || — || July 14, 2013 || Haleakala || Pan-STARRS ||  || align=right data-sort-value="0.76" | 760 m || 
|-id=580 bgcolor=#E9E9E9
| 522580 ||  || — || January 25, 2011 || Kitt Peak || Spacewatch ||  || align=right | 1.6 km || 
|-id=581 bgcolor=#E9E9E9
| 522581 ||  || — || August 28, 2009 || Kitt Peak || Spacewatch ||  || align=right data-sort-value="0.81" | 810 m || 
|-id=582 bgcolor=#fefefe
| 522582 ||  || — || March 15, 2012 || Mount Lemmon || Mount Lemmon Survey ||  || align=right data-sort-value="0.59" | 590 m || 
|-id=583 bgcolor=#fefefe
| 522583 ||  || — || September 17, 2006 || Kitt Peak || Spacewatch ||  || align=right data-sort-value="0.66" | 660 m || 
|-id=584 bgcolor=#E9E9E9
| 522584 ||  || — || January 14, 2011 || Mount Lemmon || Mount Lemmon Survey ||  || align=right | 1.2 km || 
|-id=585 bgcolor=#fefefe
| 522585 ||  || — || April 2, 2005 || Kitt Peak || Spacewatch ||  || align=right data-sort-value="0.79" | 790 m || 
|-id=586 bgcolor=#d6d6d6
| 522586 ||  || — || September 13, 2007 || Mount Lemmon || Mount Lemmon Survey ||  || align=right | 2.9 km || 
|-id=587 bgcolor=#d6d6d6
| 522587 ||  || — || April 2, 2006 || Kitt Peak || Spacewatch ||  || align=right | 1.7 km || 
|-id=588 bgcolor=#E9E9E9
| 522588 ||  || — || April 20, 2012 || Mount Lemmon || Mount Lemmon Survey ||  || align=right data-sort-value="0.76" | 760 m || 
|-id=589 bgcolor=#fefefe
| 522589 ||  || — || November 20, 2014 || Mount Lemmon || Mount Lemmon Survey ||  || align=right data-sort-value="0.63" | 630 m || 
|-id=590 bgcolor=#E9E9E9
| 522590 ||  || — || September 24, 2013 || Mount Lemmon || Mount Lemmon Survey ||  || align=right | 1.5 km || 
|-id=591 bgcolor=#E9E9E9
| 522591 ||  || — || March 13, 2016 || Haleakala || Pan-STARRS ||  || align=right | 1.1 km || 
|-id=592 bgcolor=#E9E9E9
| 522592 ||  || — || March 20, 2007 || Kitt Peak || Spacewatch ||  || align=right | 1.5 km || 
|-id=593 bgcolor=#fefefe
| 522593 ||  || — || October 13, 2007 || Kitt Peak || Spacewatch ||  || align=right data-sort-value="0.59" | 590 m || 
|-id=594 bgcolor=#E9E9E9
| 522594 ||  || — || October 13, 2013 || Mount Lemmon || Mount Lemmon Survey ||  || align=right | 1.9 km || 
|-id=595 bgcolor=#E9E9E9
| 522595 ||  || — || April 28, 2012 || Mount Lemmon || Mount Lemmon Survey ||  || align=right | 1.1 km || 
|-id=596 bgcolor=#d6d6d6
| 522596 ||  || — || April 11, 2005 || Mount Lemmon || Mount Lemmon Survey ||  || align=right | 2.4 km || 
|-id=597 bgcolor=#d6d6d6
| 522597 ||  || — || April 12, 2011 || Kitt Peak || Spacewatch ||  || align=right | 1.9 km || 
|-id=598 bgcolor=#E9E9E9
| 522598 ||  || — || November 21, 2009 || Kitt Peak || Spacewatch ||  || align=right | 2.0 km || 
|-id=599 bgcolor=#E9E9E9
| 522599 ||  || — || December 6, 2005 || Kitt Peak || Spacewatch ||  || align=right | 1.8 km || 
|-id=600 bgcolor=#E9E9E9
| 522600 ||  || — || January 14, 2011 || Mount Lemmon || Mount Lemmon Survey ||  || align=right | 1.1 km || 
|}

522601–522700 

|-bgcolor=#d6d6d6
| 522601 ||  || — || October 6, 2008 || Mount Lemmon || Mount Lemmon Survey ||  || align=right | 2.3 km || 
|-id=602 bgcolor=#E9E9E9
| 522602 ||  || — || January 17, 2015 || Mount Lemmon || Mount Lemmon Survey ||  || align=right | 2.0 km || 
|-id=603 bgcolor=#E9E9E9
| 522603 ||  || — || April 24, 2007 || Kitt Peak || Spacewatch ||  || align=right | 2.0 km || 
|-id=604 bgcolor=#fefefe
| 522604 ||  || — || February 23, 2012 || Mount Lemmon || Mount Lemmon Survey ||  || align=right data-sort-value="0.77" | 770 m || 
|-id=605 bgcolor=#E9E9E9
| 522605 ||  || — || May 19, 2012 || Mount Lemmon || Mount Lemmon Survey ||  || align=right data-sort-value="0.98" | 980 m || 
|-id=606 bgcolor=#E9E9E9
| 522606 ||  || — || February 17, 2007 || Mount Lemmon || Mount Lemmon Survey ||  || align=right | 1.1 km || 
|-id=607 bgcolor=#E9E9E9
| 522607 ||  || — || May 21, 2012 || Mount Lemmon || Mount Lemmon Survey ||  || align=right | 1.2 km || 
|-id=608 bgcolor=#fefefe
| 522608 ||  || — || April 27, 2012 || Haleakala || Pan-STARRS ||  || align=right data-sort-value="0.77" | 770 m || 
|-id=609 bgcolor=#E9E9E9
| 522609 ||  || — || October 3, 2013 || Haleakala || Pan-STARRS ||  || align=right | 2.1 km || 
|-id=610 bgcolor=#E9E9E9
| 522610 ||  || — || March 15, 2007 || Kitt Peak || Spacewatch ||  || align=right | 1.9 km || 
|-id=611 bgcolor=#d6d6d6
| 522611 ||  || — || December 2, 2008 || Kitt Peak || Spacewatch ||  || align=right | 2.1 km || 
|-id=612 bgcolor=#E9E9E9
| 522612 ||  || — || March 15, 2011 || Haleakala || Pan-STARRS ||  || align=right | 2.1 km || 
|-id=613 bgcolor=#E9E9E9
| 522613 ||  || — || July 15, 2013 || Haleakala || Pan-STARRS ||  || align=right data-sort-value="0.81" | 810 m || 
|-id=614 bgcolor=#d6d6d6
| 522614 ||  || — || April 7, 2005 || Kitt Peak || Spacewatch ||  || align=right | 2.9 km || 
|-id=615 bgcolor=#E9E9E9
| 522615 ||  || — || April 15, 2012 || Haleakala || Pan-STARRS ||  || align=right data-sort-value="0.85" | 850 m || 
|-id=616 bgcolor=#E9E9E9
| 522616 ||  || — || April 27, 2012 || Haleakala || Pan-STARRS ||  || align=right | 1.2 km || 
|-id=617 bgcolor=#E9E9E9
| 522617 ||  || — || June 28, 2005 || Kitt Peak || Spacewatch ||  || align=right | 1.2 km || 
|-id=618 bgcolor=#d6d6d6
| 522618 ||  || — || July 21, 2006 || Mount Lemmon || Mount Lemmon Survey ||  || align=right | 2.3 km || 
|-id=619 bgcolor=#fefefe
| 522619 ||  || — || December 1, 2014 || Haleakala || Pan-STARRS ||  || align=right data-sort-value="0.67" | 670 m || 
|-id=620 bgcolor=#E9E9E9
| 522620 ||  || — || March 17, 2016 || Haleakala || Pan-STARRS ||  || align=right data-sort-value="0.70" | 700 m || 
|-id=621 bgcolor=#E9E9E9
| 522621 ||  || — || October 12, 2013 || Mount Lemmon || Mount Lemmon Survey ||  || align=right data-sort-value="0.99" | 990 m || 
|-id=622 bgcolor=#fefefe
| 522622 ||  || — || September 29, 2010 || Mount Lemmon || Mount Lemmon Survey ||  || align=right data-sort-value="0.63" | 630 m || 
|-id=623 bgcolor=#d6d6d6
| 522623 ||  || — || February 16, 2010 || Kitt Peak || Spacewatch ||  || align=right | 2.7 km || 
|-id=624 bgcolor=#d6d6d6
| 522624 ||  || — || January 21, 2015 || Haleakala || Pan-STARRS ||  || align=right | 2.5 km || 
|-id=625 bgcolor=#d6d6d6
| 522625 ||  || — || August 19, 2012 || Siding Spring || SSS ||  || align=right | 2.7 km || 
|-id=626 bgcolor=#d6d6d6
| 522626 ||  || — || December 2, 2014 || Haleakala || Pan-STARRS ||  || align=right | 2.4 km || 
|-id=627 bgcolor=#E9E9E9
| 522627 ||  || — || November 10, 2004 || Kitt Peak || Spacewatch ||  || align=right | 2.1 km || 
|-id=628 bgcolor=#d6d6d6
| 522628 ||  || — || January 1, 2009 || Kitt Peak || Spacewatch ||  || align=right | 3.2 km || 
|-id=629 bgcolor=#E9E9E9
| 522629 ||  || — || April 24, 2012 || Mount Lemmon || Mount Lemmon Survey ||  || align=right | 1.0 km || 
|-id=630 bgcolor=#d6d6d6
| 522630 ||  || — || September 25, 2006 || Catalina || CSS ||  || align=right | 3.1 km || 
|-id=631 bgcolor=#E9E9E9
| 522631 ||  || — || November 24, 2014 || Haleakala || Pan-STARRS ||  || align=right data-sort-value="0.71" | 710 m || 
|-id=632 bgcolor=#d6d6d6
| 522632 ||  || — || September 9, 2007 || Kitt Peak || Spacewatch ||  || align=right | 2.5 km || 
|-id=633 bgcolor=#d6d6d6
| 522633 ||  || — || October 7, 2008 || Mount Lemmon || Mount Lemmon Survey ||  || align=right | 2.0 km || 
|-id=634 bgcolor=#d6d6d6
| 522634 ||  || — || March 4, 2005 || Kitt Peak || Spacewatch ||  || align=right | 2.6 km || 
|-id=635 bgcolor=#E9E9E9
| 522635 ||  || — || October 16, 2009 || Mount Lemmon || Mount Lemmon Survey ||  || align=right data-sort-value="0.69" | 690 m || 
|-id=636 bgcolor=#E9E9E9
| 522636 ||  || — || March 27, 2012 || Mount Lemmon || Mount Lemmon Survey ||  || align=right | 1.2 km || 
|-id=637 bgcolor=#E9E9E9
| 522637 ||  || — || November 19, 2014 || Mount Lemmon || Mount Lemmon Survey ||  || align=right | 2.2 km || 
|-id=638 bgcolor=#d6d6d6
| 522638 ||  || — || May 29, 2011 || Mount Lemmon || Mount Lemmon Survey ||  || align=right | 2.3 km || 
|-id=639 bgcolor=#d6d6d6
| 522639 ||  || — || October 7, 2007 || Kitt Peak || Spacewatch ||  || align=right | 2.5 km || 
|-id=640 bgcolor=#E9E9E9
| 522640 ||  || — || October 3, 2013 || Haleakala || Pan-STARRS ||  || align=right | 2.5 km || 
|-id=641 bgcolor=#E9E9E9
| 522641 ||  || — || November 10, 2013 || Mount Lemmon || Mount Lemmon Survey ||  || align=right data-sort-value="0.86" | 860 m || 
|-id=642 bgcolor=#E9E9E9
| 522642 ||  || — || April 1, 2016 || Haleakala || Pan-STARRS ||  || align=right | 1.7 km || 
|-id=643 bgcolor=#E9E9E9
| 522643 ||  || — || March 9, 2011 || Mount Lemmon || Mount Lemmon Survey ||  || align=right | 1.5 km || 
|-id=644 bgcolor=#d6d6d6
| 522644 ||  || — || November 19, 2008 || Kitt Peak || Spacewatch ||  || align=right | 2.4 km || 
|-id=645 bgcolor=#d6d6d6
| 522645 ||  || — || January 22, 2015 || Haleakala || Pan-STARRS ||  || align=right | 2.5 km || 
|-id=646 bgcolor=#fefefe
| 522646 ||  || — || September 13, 2007 || Kitt Peak || Spacewatch ||  || align=right data-sort-value="0.65" | 650 m || 
|-id=647 bgcolor=#d6d6d6
| 522647 ||  || — || October 11, 2012 || Kitt Peak || Spacewatch ||  || align=right | 2.8 km || 
|-id=648 bgcolor=#E9E9E9
| 522648 ||  || — || September 29, 2013 || Mount Lemmon || Mount Lemmon Survey ||  || align=right | 2.1 km || 
|-id=649 bgcolor=#fefefe
| 522649 ||  || — || November 4, 2007 || Kitt Peak || Spacewatch ||  || align=right data-sort-value="0.82" | 820 m || 
|-id=650 bgcolor=#E9E9E9
| 522650 ||  || — || October 27, 2005 || Kitt Peak || Spacewatch ||  || align=right data-sort-value="0.93" | 930 m || 
|-id=651 bgcolor=#d6d6d6
| 522651 ||  || — || October 5, 2013 || Kitt Peak || Spacewatch ||  || align=right | 2.6 km || 
|-id=652 bgcolor=#E9E9E9
| 522652 ||  || — || October 5, 2013 || Haleakala || Pan-STARRS ||  || align=right | 1.1 km || 
|-id=653 bgcolor=#d6d6d6
| 522653 ||  || — || October 8, 2012 || Haleakala || Pan-STARRS ||  || align=right | 3.5 km || 
|-id=654 bgcolor=#E9E9E9
| 522654 ||  || — || January 15, 2015 || Haleakala || Pan-STARRS ||  || align=right | 1.5 km || 
|-id=655 bgcolor=#E9E9E9
| 522655 ||  || — || June 2, 2008 || Mount Lemmon || Mount Lemmon Survey ||  || align=right | 1.5 km || 
|-id=656 bgcolor=#E9E9E9
| 522656 ||  || — || September 22, 2008 || Kitt Peak || Spacewatch ||  || align=right | 2.1 km || 
|-id=657 bgcolor=#E9E9E9
| 522657 ||  || — || October 9, 2013 || Kitt Peak || Spacewatch ||  || align=right data-sort-value="0.84" | 840 m || 
|-id=658 bgcolor=#d6d6d6
| 522658 ||  || — || August 21, 2006 || Kitt Peak || Spacewatch ||  || align=right | 2.7 km || 
|-id=659 bgcolor=#d6d6d6
| 522659 ||  || — || September 20, 2007 || Kitt Peak || Spacewatch ||  || align=right | 2.6 km || 
|-id=660 bgcolor=#d6d6d6
| 522660 ||  || — || January 14, 2015 || Haleakala || Pan-STARRS ||  || align=right | 2.0 km || 
|-id=661 bgcolor=#d6d6d6
| 522661 ||  || — || November 1, 2008 || Mount Lemmon || Mount Lemmon Survey ||  || align=right | 2.4 km || 
|-id=662 bgcolor=#d6d6d6
| 522662 ||  || — || June 7, 2011 || Haleakala || Pan-STARRS ||  || align=right | 1.7 km || 
|-id=663 bgcolor=#E9E9E9
| 522663 ||  || — || March 12, 2007 || Mount Lemmon || Mount Lemmon Survey ||  || align=right | 1.3 km || 
|-id=664 bgcolor=#fefefe
| 522664 ||  || — || January 19, 2012 || Haleakala || Pan-STARRS ||  || align=right data-sort-value="0.65" | 650 m || 
|-id=665 bgcolor=#d6d6d6
| 522665 ||  || — || April 30, 2006 || Kitt Peak || Spacewatch ||  || align=right | 2.1 km || 
|-id=666 bgcolor=#E9E9E9
| 522666 ||  || — || January 18, 2015 || Mount Lemmon || Mount Lemmon Survey ||  || align=right | 1.6 km || 
|-id=667 bgcolor=#d6d6d6
| 522667 ||  || — || March 13, 2010 || Mount Lemmon || Mount Lemmon Survey ||  || align=right | 2.3 km || 
|-id=668 bgcolor=#E9E9E9
| 522668 ||  || — || November 16, 2009 || Mount Lemmon || Mount Lemmon Survey ||  || align=right | 1.1 km || 
|-id=669 bgcolor=#d6d6d6
| 522669 ||  || — || April 11, 2016 || Haleakala || Pan-STARRS ||  || align=right | 2.2 km || 
|-id=670 bgcolor=#d6d6d6
| 522670 ||  || — || October 20, 2012 || Haleakala || Pan-STARRS ||  || align=right | 2.3 km || 
|-id=671 bgcolor=#E9E9E9
| 522671 ||  || — || February 4, 2006 || Mount Lemmon || Mount Lemmon Survey ||  || align=right | 1.9 km || 
|-id=672 bgcolor=#d6d6d6
| 522672 ||  || — || April 11, 2005 || Mount Lemmon || Mount Lemmon Survey ||  || align=right | 3.5 km || 
|-id=673 bgcolor=#E9E9E9
| 522673 ||  || — || October 9, 2013 || Mount Lemmon || Mount Lemmon Survey ||  || align=right | 1.9 km || 
|-id=674 bgcolor=#d6d6d6
| 522674 ||  || — || March 17, 2005 || Mount Lemmon || Mount Lemmon Survey ||  || align=right | 2.4 km || 
|-id=675 bgcolor=#d6d6d6
| 522675 ||  || — || April 14, 2011 || Mount Lemmon || Mount Lemmon Survey ||  || align=right | 3.2 km || 
|-id=676 bgcolor=#E9E9E9
| 522676 ||  || — || January 27, 2015 || Haleakala || Pan-STARRS ||  || align=right | 2.4 km || 
|-id=677 bgcolor=#d6d6d6
| 522677 ||  || — || December 7, 2008 || Kitt Peak || Spacewatch ||  || align=right | 2.6 km || 
|-id=678 bgcolor=#E9E9E9
| 522678 ||  || — || April 28, 2012 || Mount Lemmon || Mount Lemmon Survey ||  || align=right data-sort-value="0.68" | 680 m || 
|-id=679 bgcolor=#d6d6d6
| 522679 ||  || — || November 9, 2013 || Haleakala || Pan-STARRS ||  || align=right | 2.6 km || 
|-id=680 bgcolor=#E9E9E9
| 522680 ||  || — || January 7, 2006 || Kitt Peak || Spacewatch ||  || align=right | 1.8 km || 
|-id=681 bgcolor=#E9E9E9
| 522681 ||  || — || April 16, 2016 || Haleakala || Pan-STARRS ||  || align=right | 1.6 km || 
|-id=682 bgcolor=#E9E9E9
| 522682 ||  || — || November 11, 2013 || Kitt Peak || Spacewatch ||  || align=right | 2.0 km || 
|-id=683 bgcolor=#d6d6d6
| 522683 ||  || — || December 31, 2008 || Kitt Peak || Spacewatch ||  || align=right | 2.6 km || 
|-id=684 bgcolor=#FFC2E0
| 522684 ||  || — || May 2, 2016 || Catalina || CSS || ATEPHA || align=right data-sort-value="0.21" | 210 m || 
|-id=685 bgcolor=#d6d6d6
| 522685 ||  || — || September 25, 2006 || Kitt Peak || Spacewatch ||  || align=right | 2.7 km || 
|-id=686 bgcolor=#fefefe
| 522686 ||  || — || April 15, 2012 || Haleakala || Pan-STARRS ||  || align=right data-sort-value="0.81" | 810 m || 
|-id=687 bgcolor=#fefefe
| 522687 ||  || — || January 30, 2011 || Haleakala || Pan-STARRS ||  || align=right data-sort-value="0.95" | 950 m || 
|-id=688 bgcolor=#E9E9E9
| 522688 ||  || — || January 30, 2011 || Haleakala || Pan-STARRS ||  || align=right data-sort-value="0.90" | 900 m || 
|-id=689 bgcolor=#d6d6d6
| 522689 ||  || — || September 20, 2011 || Haleakala || Pan-STARRS ||  || align=right | 2.2 km || 
|-id=690 bgcolor=#d6d6d6
| 522690 ||  || — || February 17, 2010 || Kitt Peak || Spacewatch ||  || align=right | 2.1 km || 
|-id=691 bgcolor=#d6d6d6
| 522691 ||  || — || December 28, 2013 || Kitt Peak || Spacewatch ||  || align=right | 2.4 km || 
|-id=692 bgcolor=#E9E9E9
| 522692 ||  || — || May 30, 2016 || Haleakala || Pan-STARRS ||  || align=right | 2.0 km || 
|-id=693 bgcolor=#E9E9E9
| 522693 ||  || — || April 3, 2011 || Haleakala || Pan-STARRS ||  || align=right | 1.4 km || 
|-id=694 bgcolor=#d6d6d6
| 522694 ||  || — || November 26, 2012 || Mount Lemmon || Mount Lemmon Survey ||  || align=right | 2.9 km || 
|-id=695 bgcolor=#E9E9E9
| 522695 ||  || — || April 16, 2007 || Catalina || CSS ||  || align=right | 2.0 km || 
|-id=696 bgcolor=#E9E9E9
| 522696 ||  || — || April 11, 2011 || Mount Lemmon || Mount Lemmon Survey ||  || align=right | 2.0 km || 
|-id=697 bgcolor=#E9E9E9
| 522697 ||  || — || November 1, 2005 || Kitt Peak || Spacewatch ||  || align=right data-sort-value="0.83" | 830 m || 
|-id=698 bgcolor=#E9E9E9
| 522698 ||  || — || November 12, 2013 || Catalina || CSS ||  || align=right | 1.3 km || 
|-id=699 bgcolor=#d6d6d6
| 522699 ||  || — || November 20, 2006 || Kitt Peak || Spacewatch ||  || align=right | 4.1 km || 
|-id=700 bgcolor=#E9E9E9
| 522700 ||  || — || September 6, 2008 || Mount Lemmon || Mount Lemmon Survey ||  || align=right | 1.9 km || 
|}

522701–522800 

|-bgcolor=#d6d6d6
| 522701 ||  || — || October 15, 2012 || Haleakala || Pan-STARRS ||  || align=right | 1.9 km || 
|-id=702 bgcolor=#E9E9E9
| 522702 ||  || — || August 31, 1995 || Kitt Peak || Spacewatch ||  || align=right | 2.1 km || 
|-id=703 bgcolor=#E9E9E9
| 522703 ||  || — || March 27, 2011 || Mount Lemmon || Mount Lemmon Survey ||  || align=right | 1.8 km || 
|-id=704 bgcolor=#d6d6d6
| 522704 ||  || — || October 21, 2012 || Haleakala || Pan-STARRS ||  || align=right | 2.0 km || 
|-id=705 bgcolor=#E9E9E9
| 522705 ||  || — || April 24, 2011 || Mount Lemmon || Mount Lemmon Survey ||  || align=right | 1.7 km || 
|-id=706 bgcolor=#d6d6d6
| 522706 ||  || — || October 6, 2012 || Haleakala || Pan-STARRS ||  || align=right | 2.5 km || 
|-id=707 bgcolor=#d6d6d6
| 522707 ||  || — || April 18, 2015 || Haleakala || Pan-STARRS ||  || align=right | 2.6 km || 
|-id=708 bgcolor=#d6d6d6
| 522708 ||  || — || October 22, 2012 || Haleakala || Pan-STARRS ||  || align=right | 3.3 km || 
|-id=709 bgcolor=#d6d6d6
| 522709 ||  || — || October 27, 2006 || Kitt Peak || Spacewatch ||  || align=right | 3.1 km || 
|-id=710 bgcolor=#d6d6d6
| 522710 ||  || — || September 23, 2011 || Kitt Peak || Spacewatch ||  || align=right | 2.4 km || 
|-id=711 bgcolor=#d6d6d6
| 522711 ||  || — || January 1, 2014 || Haleakala || Pan-STARRS ||  || align=right | 2.0 km || 
|-id=712 bgcolor=#E9E9E9
| 522712 ||  || — || August 23, 2004 || Kitt Peak || Spacewatch ||  || align=right data-sort-value="0.97" | 970 m || 
|-id=713 bgcolor=#fefefe
| 522713 ||  || — || February 23, 2012 || Mount Lemmon || Mount Lemmon Survey ||  || align=right data-sort-value="0.55" | 550 m || 
|-id=714 bgcolor=#E9E9E9
| 522714 ||  || — || October 5, 2013 || Kitt Peak || Spacewatch ||  || align=right | 2.5 km || 
|-id=715 bgcolor=#d6d6d6
| 522715 ||  || — || October 7, 2005 || Catalina || CSS ||  || align=right | 3.3 km || 
|-id=716 bgcolor=#d6d6d6
| 522716 ||  || — || April 18, 2015 || Haleakala || Pan-STARRS ||  || align=right | 2.4 km || 
|-id=717 bgcolor=#d6d6d6
| 522717 ||  || — || November 3, 2007 || Kitt Peak || Spacewatch ||  || align=right | 1.9 km || 
|-id=718 bgcolor=#E9E9E9
| 522718 ||  || — || May 21, 2011 || Haleakala || Pan-STARRS ||  || align=right | 1.8 km || 
|-id=719 bgcolor=#d6d6d6
| 522719 ||  || — || September 20, 2011 || Mount Lemmon || Mount Lemmon Survey ||  || align=right | 2.7 km || 
|-id=720 bgcolor=#E9E9E9
| 522720 ||  || — || November 28, 2013 || Kitt Peak || Spacewatch ||  || align=right data-sort-value="0.88" | 880 m || 
|-id=721 bgcolor=#E9E9E9
| 522721 ||  || — || August 25, 2012 || Haleakala || Pan-STARRS ||  || align=right | 1.6 km || 
|-id=722 bgcolor=#E9E9E9
| 522722 ||  || — || August 9, 2007 || Kitt Peak || Spacewatch ||  || align=right | 2.1 km || 
|-id=723 bgcolor=#d6d6d6
| 522723 ||  || — || February 10, 2014 || Haleakala || Pan-STARRS ||  || align=right | 2.4 km || 
|-id=724 bgcolor=#d6d6d6
| 522724 ||  || — || September 8, 2011 || Kitt Peak || Spacewatch ||  || align=right | 2.4 km || 
|-id=725 bgcolor=#d6d6d6
| 522725 ||  || — || June 7, 2015 || Mount Lemmon || Mount Lemmon Survey ||  || align=right | 2.6 km || 
|-id=726 bgcolor=#d6d6d6
| 522726 ||  || — || June 14, 2005 || Kitt Peak || Spacewatch ||  || align=right | 2.9 km || 
|-id=727 bgcolor=#d6d6d6
| 522727 ||  || — || January 28, 2014 || Kitt Peak || Spacewatch ||  || align=right | 2.2 km || 
|-id=728 bgcolor=#d6d6d6
| 522728 ||  || — || October 19, 2006 || Kitt Peak || Spacewatch ||  || align=right | 2.5 km || 
|-id=729 bgcolor=#E9E9E9
| 522729 ||  || — || November 28, 2013 || Mount Lemmon || Mount Lemmon Survey ||  || align=right | 1.4 km || 
|-id=730 bgcolor=#E9E9E9
| 522730 ||  || — || May 24, 2011 || Haleakala || Pan-STARRS ||  || align=right | 1.4 km || 
|-id=731 bgcolor=#fefefe
| 522731 ||  || — || May 28, 2008 || Mount Lemmon || Mount Lemmon Survey ||  || align=right data-sort-value="0.68" | 680 m || 
|-id=732 bgcolor=#d6d6d6
| 522732 ||  || — || May 21, 2015 || Haleakala || Pan-STARRS ||  || align=right | 1.9 km || 
|-id=733 bgcolor=#d6d6d6
| 522733 ||  || — || September 27, 2011 || Mount Lemmon || Mount Lemmon Survey ||  || align=right | 3.3 km || 
|-id=734 bgcolor=#E9E9E9
| 522734 ||  || — || November 20, 2009 || Kitt Peak || Spacewatch ||  || align=right | 1.7 km || 
|-id=735 bgcolor=#E9E9E9
| 522735 ||  || — || April 4, 2011 || Mount Lemmon || Mount Lemmon Survey ||  || align=right | 1.5 km || 
|-id=736 bgcolor=#d6d6d6
| 522736 ||  || — || October 23, 2012 || Kitt Peak || Spacewatch ||  || align=right | 2.9 km || 
|-id=737 bgcolor=#d6d6d6
| 522737 ||  || — || January 24, 2014 || Haleakala || Pan-STARRS ||  || align=right | 3.2 km || 
|-id=738 bgcolor=#fefefe
| 522738 ||  || — || January 21, 2015 || Haleakala || Pan-STARRS ||  || align=right data-sort-value="0.81" | 810 m || 
|-id=739 bgcolor=#d6d6d6
| 522739 ||  || — || June 8, 2016 || Haleakala || Pan-STARRS ||  || align=right | 3.4 km || 
|-id=740 bgcolor=#E9E9E9
| 522740 ||  || — || May 1, 2011 || Haleakala || Pan-STARRS ||  || align=right | 1.2 km || 
|-id=741 bgcolor=#E9E9E9
| 522741 ||  || — || June 17, 2012 || Mount Lemmon || Mount Lemmon Survey ||  || align=right | 1.6 km || 
|-id=742 bgcolor=#fefefe
| 522742 ||  || — || September 17, 2006 || Kitt Peak || Spacewatch ||  || align=right data-sort-value="0.73" | 730 m || 
|-id=743 bgcolor=#E9E9E9
| 522743 ||  || — || December 3, 2008 || Kitt Peak || Spacewatch ||  || align=right | 1.3 km || 
|-id=744 bgcolor=#fefefe
| 522744 ||  || — || July 27, 2008 || La Sagra || OAM Obs. ||  || align=right data-sort-value="0.92" | 920 m || 
|-id=745 bgcolor=#E9E9E9
| 522745 ||  || — || March 4, 2011 || Mount Lemmon || Mount Lemmon Survey ||  || align=right | 1.2 km || 
|-id=746 bgcolor=#d6d6d6
| 522746 ||  || — || November 22, 2006 || Kitt Peak || Spacewatch ||  || align=right | 2.3 km || 
|-id=747 bgcolor=#d6d6d6
| 522747 ||  || — || September 20, 2011 || Haleakala || Pan-STARRS ||  || align=right | 2.1 km || 
|-id=748 bgcolor=#fefefe
| 522748 ||  || — || November 26, 2009 || Kitt Peak || Spacewatch ||  || align=right data-sort-value="0.83" | 830 m || 
|-id=749 bgcolor=#E9E9E9
| 522749 ||  || — || March 21, 2015 || Haleakala || Pan-STARRS ||  || align=right | 1.1 km || 
|-id=750 bgcolor=#d6d6d6
| 522750 ||  || — || October 22, 2012 || Haleakala || Pan-STARRS ||  || align=right | 2.0 km || 
|-id=751 bgcolor=#d6d6d6
| 522751 ||  || — || September 25, 2006 || Mount Lemmon || Mount Lemmon Survey ||  || align=right | 2.5 km || 
|-id=752 bgcolor=#d6d6d6
| 522752 ||  || — || September 20, 2011 || Haleakala || Pan-STARRS ||  || align=right | 3.0 km || 
|-id=753 bgcolor=#E9E9E9
| 522753 ||  || — || October 10, 2012 || Mount Lemmon || Mount Lemmon Survey ||  || align=right | 2.0 km || 
|-id=754 bgcolor=#E9E9E9
| 522754 ||  || — || May 9, 2007 || Kitt Peak || Spacewatch ||  || align=right | 1.3 km || 
|-id=755 bgcolor=#E9E9E9
| 522755 ||  || — || February 23, 2015 || Haleakala || Pan-STARRS ||  || align=right | 1.7 km || 
|-id=756 bgcolor=#E9E9E9
| 522756 ||  || — || October 31, 2008 || Kitt Peak || Spacewatch ||  || align=right | 2.5 km || 
|-id=757 bgcolor=#E9E9E9
| 522757 ||  || — || September 6, 2004 || Siding Spring || SSS ||  || align=right | 1.0 km || 
|-id=758 bgcolor=#d6d6d6
| 522758 ||  || — || October 16, 2012 || Kitt Peak || Spacewatch ||  || align=right | 3.4 km || 
|-id=759 bgcolor=#d6d6d6
| 522759 ||  || — || May 18, 2015 || Mount Lemmon || Mount Lemmon Survey ||  || align=right | 2.9 km || 
|-id=760 bgcolor=#E9E9E9
| 522760 ||  || — || February 16, 2010 || Mount Lemmon || Mount Lemmon Survey ||  || align=right | 1.4 km || 
|-id=761 bgcolor=#d6d6d6
| 522761 ||  || — || December 30, 2007 || Mount Lemmon || Mount Lemmon Survey ||  || align=right | 2.3 km || 
|-id=762 bgcolor=#E9E9E9
| 522762 ||  || — || September 24, 2012 || Kitt Peak || Spacewatch ||  || align=right | 1.6 km || 
|-id=763 bgcolor=#E9E9E9
| 522763 ||  || — || January 21, 2015 || Haleakala || Pan-STARRS ||  || align=right data-sort-value="0.98" | 980 m || 
|-id=764 bgcolor=#d6d6d6
| 522764 ||  || — || July 4, 2016 || Haleakala || Pan-STARRS ||  || align=right | 2.4 km || 
|-id=765 bgcolor=#E9E9E9
| 522765 ||  || — || November 7, 2008 || Mount Lemmon || Mount Lemmon Survey ||  || align=right | 1.7 km || 
|-id=766 bgcolor=#d6d6d6
| 522766 ||  || — || August 3, 2011 || Haleakala || Pan-STARRS ||  || align=right | 2.8 km || 
|-id=767 bgcolor=#d6d6d6
| 522767 ||  || — || March 25, 2015 || Haleakala || Pan-STARRS ||  || align=right | 3.2 km || 
|-id=768 bgcolor=#d6d6d6
| 522768 ||  || — || June 12, 2011 || Mount Lemmon || Mount Lemmon Survey ||  || align=right | 2.5 km || 
|-id=769 bgcolor=#E9E9E9
| 522769 ||  || — || September 21, 2012 || Mount Lemmon || Mount Lemmon Survey ||  || align=right | 1.3 km || 
|-id=770 bgcolor=#E9E9E9
| 522770 ||  || — || April 2, 2011 || Haleakala || Pan-STARRS ||  || align=right | 1.4 km || 
|-id=771 bgcolor=#d6d6d6
| 522771 ||  || — || August 28, 2011 || Haleakala || Pan-STARRS ||  || align=right | 2.2 km || 
|-id=772 bgcolor=#d6d6d6
| 522772 ||  || — || September 4, 2000 || Kitt Peak || Spacewatch ||  || align=right | 2.2 km || 
|-id=773 bgcolor=#d6d6d6
| 522773 ||  || — || December 31, 2007 || Kitt Peak || Spacewatch ||  || align=right | 2.9 km || 
|-id=774 bgcolor=#d6d6d6
| 522774 ||  || — || February 10, 2014 || Haleakala || Pan-STARRS ||  || align=right | 2.0 km || 
|-id=775 bgcolor=#E9E9E9
| 522775 ||  || — || July 30, 2008 || Mount Lemmon || Mount Lemmon Survey ||  || align=right data-sort-value="0.83" | 830 m || 
|-id=776 bgcolor=#d6d6d6
| 522776 ||  || — || February 12, 2008 || Mount Lemmon || Mount Lemmon Survey ||  || align=right | 2.6 km || 
|-id=777 bgcolor=#E9E9E9
| 522777 ||  || — || September 3, 2008 || Kitt Peak || Spacewatch ||  || align=right | 1.1 km || 
|-id=778 bgcolor=#d6d6d6
| 522778 ||  || — || September 23, 2011 || Mount Lemmon || Mount Lemmon Survey ||  || align=right | 2.1 km || 
|-id=779 bgcolor=#E9E9E9
| 522779 ||  || — || April 14, 2011 || Mount Lemmon || Mount Lemmon Survey ||  || align=right | 1.4 km || 
|-id=780 bgcolor=#d6d6d6
| 522780 ||  || — || January 10, 2013 || Haleakala || Pan-STARRS ||  || align=right | 2.1 km || 
|-id=781 bgcolor=#d6d6d6
| 522781 ||  || — || December 15, 2007 || Mount Lemmon || Mount Lemmon Survey ||  || align=right | 2.5 km || 
|-id=782 bgcolor=#E9E9E9
| 522782 ||  || — || November 20, 2009 || Mount Lemmon || Mount Lemmon Survey ||  || align=right | 1.3 km || 
|-id=783 bgcolor=#d6d6d6
| 522783 ||  || — || April 2, 2009 || Mount Lemmon || Mount Lemmon Survey ||  || align=right | 3.2 km || 
|-id=784 bgcolor=#d6d6d6
| 522784 ||  || — || September 25, 2006 || Kitt Peak || Spacewatch ||  || align=right | 2.1 km || 
|-id=785 bgcolor=#E9E9E9
| 522785 ||  || — || September 18, 2003 || Kitt Peak || Spacewatch ||  || align=right | 2.0 km || 
|-id=786 bgcolor=#E9E9E9
| 522786 ||  || — || September 21, 2008 || Kitt Peak || Spacewatch ||  || align=right | 1.8 km || 
|-id=787 bgcolor=#d6d6d6
| 522787 ||  || — || February 24, 2014 || Haleakala || Pan-STARRS ||  || align=right | 2.4 km || 
|-id=788 bgcolor=#d6d6d6
| 522788 ||  || — || December 3, 2007 || Kitt Peak || Spacewatch ||  || align=right | 2.2 km || 
|-id=789 bgcolor=#d6d6d6
| 522789 ||  || — || January 29, 2014 || Kitt Peak || Spacewatch ||  || align=right | 2.6 km || 
|-id=790 bgcolor=#E9E9E9
| 522790 ||  || — || March 24, 2015 || Mount Lemmon || Mount Lemmon Survey ||  || align=right | 1.4 km || 
|-id=791 bgcolor=#E9E9E9
| 522791 ||  || — || March 9, 2011 || Mount Lemmon || Mount Lemmon Survey ||  || align=right data-sort-value="0.88" | 880 m || 
|-id=792 bgcolor=#fefefe
| 522792 ||  || — || December 24, 2013 || Mount Lemmon || Mount Lemmon Survey ||  || align=right data-sort-value="0.79" | 790 m || 
|-id=793 bgcolor=#d6d6d6
| 522793 ||  || — || September 24, 2011 || Haleakala || Pan-STARRS ||  || align=right | 2.9 km || 
|-id=794 bgcolor=#d6d6d6
| 522794 ||  || — || March 10, 2014 || Mount Lemmon || Mount Lemmon Survey ||  || align=right | 2.8 km || 
|-id=795 bgcolor=#E9E9E9
| 522795 ||  || — || August 26, 2012 || Haleakala || Pan-STARRS ||  || align=right | 1.8 km || 
|-id=796 bgcolor=#d6d6d6
| 522796 ||  || — || August 27, 2011 || Haleakala || Pan-STARRS ||  || align=right | 2.6 km || 
|-id=797 bgcolor=#d6d6d6
| 522797 ||  || — || March 29, 2015 || Haleakala || Pan-STARRS ||  || align=right | 2.9 km || 
|-id=798 bgcolor=#E9E9E9
| 522798 ||  || — || February 28, 2014 || Haleakala || Pan-STARRS ||  || align=right | 1.5 km || 
|-id=799 bgcolor=#d6d6d6
| 522799 ||  || — || October 21, 2011 || Kitt Peak || Spacewatch ||  || align=right | 2.7 km || 
|-id=800 bgcolor=#d6d6d6
| 522800 ||  || — || August 29, 2005 || Kitt Peak || Spacewatch ||  || align=right | 2.2 km || 
|}

522801–522900 

|-bgcolor=#d6d6d6
| 522801 ||  || — || October 13, 2006 || Kitt Peak || Spacewatch ||  || align=right | 2.5 km || 
|-id=802 bgcolor=#E9E9E9
| 522802 ||  || — || February 24, 2015 || Haleakala || Pan-STARRS ||  || align=right | 1.2 km || 
|-id=803 bgcolor=#d6d6d6
| 522803 ||  || — || October 2, 2006 || Mount Lemmon || Mount Lemmon Survey ||  || align=right | 2.4 km || 
|-id=804 bgcolor=#E9E9E9
| 522804 ||  || — || October 16, 2012 || Mount Lemmon || Mount Lemmon Survey ||  || align=right | 1.6 km || 
|-id=805 bgcolor=#d6d6d6
| 522805 ||  || — || June 15, 2005 || Mount Lemmon || Mount Lemmon Survey ||  || align=right | 2.3 km || 
|-id=806 bgcolor=#fefefe
| 522806 ||  || — || October 26, 2009 || Mount Lemmon || Mount Lemmon Survey ||  || align=right data-sort-value="0.83" | 830 m || 
|-id=807 bgcolor=#E9E9E9
| 522807 ||  || — || December 31, 2008 || Mount Lemmon || Mount Lemmon Survey ||  || align=right | 2.3 km || 
|-id=808 bgcolor=#fefefe
| 522808 ||  || — || April 27, 2011 || Mount Lemmon || Mount Lemmon Survey ||  || align=right data-sort-value="0.83" | 830 m || 
|-id=809 bgcolor=#d6d6d6
| 522809 ||  || — || May 22, 2015 || Haleakala || Pan-STARRS ||  || align=right | 2.4 km || 
|-id=810 bgcolor=#d6d6d6
| 522810 ||  || — || November 1, 2006 || Mount Lemmon || Mount Lemmon Survey ||  || align=right | 3.1 km || 
|-id=811 bgcolor=#d6d6d6
| 522811 ||  || — || February 21, 2014 || Kitt Peak || Spacewatch ||  || align=right | 2.4 km || 
|-id=812 bgcolor=#d6d6d6
| 522812 ||  || — || September 4, 2011 || Haleakala || Pan-STARRS ||  || align=right | 2.6 km || 
|-id=813 bgcolor=#E9E9E9
| 522813 ||  || — || March 28, 2015 || Haleakala || Pan-STARRS ||  || align=right | 1.3 km || 
|-id=814 bgcolor=#d6d6d6
| 522814 ||  || — || March 28, 2015 || Haleakala || Pan-STARRS ||  || align=right | 2.5 km || 
|-id=815 bgcolor=#E9E9E9
| 522815 ||  || — || October 14, 2012 || Catalina || CSS ||  || align=right | 2.2 km || 
|-id=816 bgcolor=#d6d6d6
| 522816 ||  || — || February 26, 2014 || Mount Lemmon || Mount Lemmon Survey ||  || align=right | 2.6 km || 
|-id=817 bgcolor=#E9E9E9
| 522817 ||  || — || April 20, 2007 || Kitt Peak || Spacewatch ||  || align=right | 1.3 km || 
|-id=818 bgcolor=#d6d6d6
| 522818 ||  || — || July 12, 2005 || Kitt Peak || Spacewatch ||  || align=right | 3.0 km || 
|-id=819 bgcolor=#E9E9E9
| 522819 ||  || — || October 6, 2008 || Mount Lemmon || Mount Lemmon Survey ||  || align=right | 1.2 km || 
|-id=820 bgcolor=#d6d6d6
| 522820 ||  || — || January 1, 2008 || Kitt Peak || Spacewatch ||  || align=right | 2.7 km || 
|-id=821 bgcolor=#fefefe
| 522821 ||  || — || January 30, 2011 || Haleakala || Pan-STARRS ||  || align=right data-sort-value="0.90" | 900 m || 
|-id=822 bgcolor=#d6d6d6
| 522822 ||  || — || January 1, 2014 || Kitt Peak || Spacewatch ||  || align=right | 2.3 km || 
|-id=823 bgcolor=#E9E9E9
| 522823 ||  || — || November 8, 2008 || Mount Lemmon || Mount Lemmon Survey ||  || align=right | 1.2 km || 
|-id=824 bgcolor=#d6d6d6
| 522824 ||  || — || September 26, 2011 || Haleakala || Pan-STARRS ||  || align=right | 1.7 km || 
|-id=825 bgcolor=#E9E9E9
| 522825 ||  || — || October 5, 2012 || Mount Lemmon || Mount Lemmon Survey ||  || align=right | 1.1 km || 
|-id=826 bgcolor=#E9E9E9
| 522826 ||  || — || December 5, 2013 || Haleakala || Pan-STARRS ||  || align=right | 1.0 km || 
|-id=827 bgcolor=#d6d6d6
| 522827 ||  || — || August 24, 2011 || Haleakala || Pan-STARRS ||  || align=right | 2.6 km || 
|-id=828 bgcolor=#d6d6d6
| 522828 ||  || — || August 30, 2005 || Kitt Peak || Spacewatch ||  || align=right | 2.3 km || 
|-id=829 bgcolor=#d6d6d6
| 522829 ||  || — || November 24, 2012 || Kitt Peak || Spacewatch ||  || align=right | 2.3 km || 
|-id=830 bgcolor=#E9E9E9
| 522830 ||  || — || December 1, 2008 || Kitt Peak || Spacewatch ||  || align=right | 1.7 km || 
|-id=831 bgcolor=#E9E9E9
| 522831 ||  || — || June 12, 2011 || Mount Lemmon || Mount Lemmon Survey ||  || align=right | 2.3 km || 
|-id=832 bgcolor=#d6d6d6
| 522832 ||  || — || December 12, 2012 || Mount Lemmon || Mount Lemmon Survey ||  || align=right | 2.8 km || 
|-id=833 bgcolor=#d6d6d6
| 522833 ||  || — || February 9, 2008 || Kitt Peak || Spacewatch ||  || align=right | 2.4 km || 
|-id=834 bgcolor=#d6d6d6
| 522834 ||  || — || December 31, 2007 || Mount Lemmon || Mount Lemmon Survey ||  || align=right | 2.7 km || 
|-id=835 bgcolor=#d6d6d6
| 522835 ||  || — || January 18, 2013 || Haleakala || Pan-STARRS ||  || align=right | 2.3 km || 
|-id=836 bgcolor=#E9E9E9
| 522836 ||  || — || April 17, 2015 || Mount Lemmon || Mount Lemmon Survey ||  || align=right | 1.6 km || 
|-id=837 bgcolor=#d6d6d6
| 522837 ||  || — || March 17, 2009 || Kitt Peak || Spacewatch ||  || align=right | 2.5 km || 
|-id=838 bgcolor=#d6d6d6
| 522838 ||  || — || September 19, 2011 || Haleakala || Pan-STARRS ||  || align=right | 2.8 km || 
|-id=839 bgcolor=#fefefe
| 522839 ||  || — || February 9, 2008 || Kitt Peak || Spacewatch ||  || align=right data-sort-value="0.66" | 660 m || 
|-id=840 bgcolor=#E9E9E9
| 522840 ||  || — || October 23, 2008 || Mount Lemmon || Mount Lemmon Survey ||  || align=right | 1.2 km || 
|-id=841 bgcolor=#E9E9E9
| 522841 ||  || — || September 21, 2012 || Kitt Peak || Spacewatch ||  || align=right | 1.2 km || 
|-id=842 bgcolor=#d6d6d6
| 522842 ||  || — || February 18, 2014 || Mount Lemmon || Mount Lemmon Survey ||  || align=right | 2.6 km || 
|-id=843 bgcolor=#fefefe
| 522843 ||  || — || July 11, 2016 || Haleakala || Pan-STARRS ||  || align=right data-sort-value="0.94" | 940 m || 
|-id=844 bgcolor=#E9E9E9
| 522844 ||  || — || December 22, 2008 || Kitt Peak || Spacewatch ||  || align=right | 2.0 km || 
|-id=845 bgcolor=#E9E9E9
| 522845 ||  || — || December 30, 2013 || Mount Lemmon || Mount Lemmon Survey ||  || align=right data-sort-value="0.81" | 810 m || 
|-id=846 bgcolor=#E9E9E9
| 522846 ||  || — || September 18, 2007 || Anderson Mesa || LONEOS ||  || align=right | 1.9 km || 
|-id=847 bgcolor=#fefefe
| 522847 ||  || — || December 2, 2005 || Kitt Peak || Spacewatch ||  || align=right | 1.0 km || 
|-id=848 bgcolor=#E9E9E9
| 522848 ||  || — || October 5, 2012 || Kitt Peak || Spacewatch ||  || align=right | 1.1 km || 
|-id=849 bgcolor=#d6d6d6
| 522849 ||  || — || May 27, 2015 || Mount Lemmon || Mount Lemmon Survey ||  || align=right | 2.2 km || 
|-id=850 bgcolor=#E9E9E9
| 522850 ||  || — || November 12, 2012 || Mount Lemmon || Mount Lemmon Survey ||  || align=right | 1.9 km || 
|-id=851 bgcolor=#d6d6d6
| 522851 ||  || — || February 11, 2014 || Mount Lemmon || Mount Lemmon Survey ||  || align=right | 2.7 km || 
|-id=852 bgcolor=#E9E9E9
| 522852 ||  || — || February 20, 2015 || Haleakala || Pan-STARRS ||  || align=right data-sort-value="0.86" | 860 m || 
|-id=853 bgcolor=#d6d6d6
| 522853 ||  || — || January 1, 2008 || Kitt Peak || Spacewatch ||  || align=right | 2.5 km || 
|-id=854 bgcolor=#d6d6d6
| 522854 ||  || — || July 12, 2016 || Mount Lemmon || Mount Lemmon Survey ||  || align=right | 2.2 km || 
|-id=855 bgcolor=#E9E9E9
| 522855 ||  || — || September 26, 2008 || Kitt Peak || Spacewatch ||  || align=right | 1.1 km || 
|-id=856 bgcolor=#d6d6d6
| 522856 ||  || — || February 3, 2009 || Kitt Peak || Spacewatch ||  || align=right | 2.3 km || 
|-id=857 bgcolor=#E9E9E9
| 522857 ||  || — || December 14, 2013 || Mount Lemmon || Mount Lemmon Survey ||  || align=right | 1.3 km || 
|-id=858 bgcolor=#d6d6d6
| 522858 ||  || — || September 25, 2006 || Kitt Peak || Spacewatch ||  || align=right | 2.0 km || 
|-id=859 bgcolor=#E9E9E9
| 522859 ||  || — || March 21, 2015 || Haleakala || Pan-STARRS ||  || align=right | 1.5 km || 
|-id=860 bgcolor=#d6d6d6
| 522860 ||  || — || September 24, 2011 || Haleakala || Pan-STARRS ||  || align=right | 2.1 km || 
|-id=861 bgcolor=#E9E9E9
| 522861 ||  || — || January 31, 2006 || Kitt Peak || Spacewatch ||  || align=right | 1.2 km || 
|-id=862 bgcolor=#d6d6d6
| 522862 ||  || — || March 17, 2015 || Haleakala || Pan-STARRS ||  || align=right | 2.3 km || 
|-id=863 bgcolor=#E9E9E9
| 522863 ||  || — || October 20, 2008 || Kitt Peak || Spacewatch ||  || align=right | 1.4 km || 
|-id=864 bgcolor=#d6d6d6
| 522864 ||  || — || October 4, 2007 || Kitt Peak || Spacewatch ||  || align=right | 1.7 km || 
|-id=865 bgcolor=#d6d6d6
| 522865 ||  || — || July 14, 2016 || Haleakala || Pan-STARRS ||  || align=right | 2.1 km || 
|-id=866 bgcolor=#d6d6d6
| 522866 ||  || — || July 14, 2016 || Haleakala || Pan-STARRS ||  || align=right | 2.3 km || 
|-id=867 bgcolor=#d6d6d6
| 522867 ||  || — || March 28, 2015 || Haleakala || Pan-STARRS ||  || align=right | 2.1 km || 
|-id=868 bgcolor=#d6d6d6
| 522868 ||  || — || September 13, 2005 || Kitt Peak || Spacewatch ||  || align=right | 2.2 km || 
|-id=869 bgcolor=#E9E9E9
| 522869 ||  || — || August 10, 2007 || Kitt Peak || Spacewatch ||  || align=right | 2.1 km || 
|-id=870 bgcolor=#E9E9E9
| 522870 ||  || — || October 8, 2012 || Haleakala || Pan-STARRS ||  || align=right | 1.6 km || 
|-id=871 bgcolor=#d6d6d6
| 522871 ||  || — || November 19, 2006 || Kitt Peak || Spacewatch ||  || align=right | 1.8 km || 
|-id=872 bgcolor=#E9E9E9
| 522872 ||  || — || May 23, 2006 || Kitt Peak || Spacewatch ||  || align=right | 2.0 km || 
|-id=873 bgcolor=#fefefe
| 522873 ||  || — || February 13, 2004 || Kitt Peak || Spacewatch ||  || align=right data-sort-value="0.82" | 820 m || 
|-id=874 bgcolor=#fefefe
| 522874 ||  || — || October 11, 2005 || Anderson Mesa || LONEOS || H || align=right data-sort-value="0.76" | 760 m || 
|-id=875 bgcolor=#E9E9E9
| 522875 ||  || — || September 14, 2013 || Haleakala || Pan-STARRS ||  || align=right | 1.5 km || 
|-id=876 bgcolor=#d6d6d6
| 522876 ||  || — || June 13, 2010 || Mount Lemmon || Mount Lemmon Survey ||  || align=right | 3.1 km || 
|-id=877 bgcolor=#E9E9E9
| 522877 ||  || — || March 22, 2015 || Haleakala || Pan-STARRS ||  || align=right | 1.5 km || 
|-id=878 bgcolor=#d6d6d6
| 522878 ||  || — || February 9, 2007 || Kitt Peak || Spacewatch ||  || align=right | 2.8 km || 
|-id=879 bgcolor=#d6d6d6
| 522879 ||  || — || October 25, 2011 || Kitt Peak || Spacewatch ||  || align=right | 2.7 km || 
|-id=880 bgcolor=#E9E9E9
| 522880 ||  || — || July 2, 2011 || Mount Lemmon || Mount Lemmon Survey ||  || align=right | 1.1 km || 
|-id=881 bgcolor=#d6d6d6
| 522881 ||  || — || November 1, 2011 || Mount Lemmon || Mount Lemmon Survey ||  || align=right | 3.4 km || 
|-id=882 bgcolor=#d6d6d6
| 522882 ||  || — || November 17, 2011 || Kitt Peak || Spacewatch ||  || align=right | 2.5 km || 
|-id=883 bgcolor=#E9E9E9
| 522883 ||  || — || September 15, 2007 || Kitt Peak || Spacewatch ||  || align=right | 1.5 km || 
|-id=884 bgcolor=#d6d6d6
| 522884 ||  || — || January 16, 2013 || Mount Lemmon || Mount Lemmon Survey ||  || align=right | 2.7 km || 
|-id=885 bgcolor=#d6d6d6
| 522885 ||  || — || September 13, 2005 || Catalina || CSS || Tj (2.96) || align=right | 3.8 km || 
|-id=886 bgcolor=#fefefe
| 522886 ||  || — || September 21, 2009 || Kitt Peak || Spacewatch ||  || align=right data-sort-value="0.78" | 780 m || 
|-id=887 bgcolor=#d6d6d6
| 522887 ||  || — || May 21, 2010 || Mount Lemmon || Mount Lemmon Survey ||  || align=right | 2.7 km || 
|-id=888 bgcolor=#d6d6d6
| 522888 ||  || — || November 7, 2007 || Mount Lemmon || Mount Lemmon Survey ||  || align=right | 3.0 km || 
|-id=889 bgcolor=#E9E9E9
| 522889 ||  || — || October 23, 2008 || Kitt Peak || Spacewatch ||  || align=right | 1.0 km || 
|-id=890 bgcolor=#E9E9E9
| 522890 ||  || — || October 8, 2012 || Haleakala || Pan-STARRS ||  || align=right | 1.4 km || 
|-id=891 bgcolor=#d6d6d6
| 522891 ||  || — || September 24, 2011 || Haleakala || Pan-STARRS ||  || align=right | 3.4 km || 
|-id=892 bgcolor=#E9E9E9
| 522892 ||  || — || April 22, 2015 || Kitt Peak || Spacewatch ||  || align=right | 1.2 km || 
|-id=893 bgcolor=#d6d6d6
| 522893 ||  || — || February 3, 2009 || Kitt Peak || Spacewatch ||  || align=right | 3.0 km || 
|-id=894 bgcolor=#fefefe
| 522894 ||  || — || January 6, 2010 || Kitt Peak || Spacewatch || H || align=right data-sort-value="0.64" | 640 m || 
|-id=895 bgcolor=#d6d6d6
| 522895 ||  || — || October 19, 2006 || Kitt Peak || Spacewatch ||  || align=right | 2.1 km || 
|-id=896 bgcolor=#d6d6d6
| 522896 ||  || — || February 19, 2009 || Kitt Peak || Spacewatch ||  || align=right | 2.1 km || 
|-id=897 bgcolor=#E9E9E9
| 522897 ||  || — || December 16, 2004 || Kitt Peak || Spacewatch ||  || align=right | 1.5 km || 
|-id=898 bgcolor=#d6d6d6
| 522898 ||  || — || November 11, 2007 || Mount Lemmon || Mount Lemmon Survey ||  || align=right | 2.3 km || 
|-id=899 bgcolor=#d6d6d6
| 522899 ||  || — || October 4, 2004 || Kitt Peak || Spacewatch || 7:4 || align=right | 2.9 km || 
|-id=900 bgcolor=#d6d6d6
| 522900 ||  || — || December 22, 2012 || Haleakala || Pan-STARRS ||  || align=right | 2.1 km || 
|}

522901–523000 

|-bgcolor=#d6d6d6
| 522901 ||  || — || December 19, 2007 || Kitt Peak || Spacewatch ||  || align=right | 2.2 km || 
|-id=902 bgcolor=#d6d6d6
| 522902 ||  || — || February 27, 2008 || Kitt Peak || Spacewatch ||  || align=right | 2.9 km || 
|-id=903 bgcolor=#d6d6d6
| 522903 ||  || — || April 18, 2009 || Kitt Peak || Spacewatch ||  || align=right | 2.7 km || 
|-id=904 bgcolor=#d6d6d6
| 522904 ||  || — || September 24, 2011 || Haleakala || Pan-STARRS ||  || align=right | 2.2 km || 
|-id=905 bgcolor=#d6d6d6
| 522905 ||  || — || March 26, 2014 || Mount Lemmon || Mount Lemmon Survey ||  || align=right | 2.8 km || 
|-id=906 bgcolor=#E9E9E9
| 522906 ||  || — || August 2, 2016 || Haleakala || Pan-STARRS ||  || align=right | 1.0 km || 
|-id=907 bgcolor=#d6d6d6
| 522907 ||  || — || September 28, 2006 || Kitt Peak || Spacewatch ||  || align=right | 2.4 km || 
|-id=908 bgcolor=#fefefe
| 522908 ||  || — || November 7, 2010 || Mount Lemmon || Mount Lemmon Survey ||  || align=right data-sort-value="0.65" | 650 m || 
|-id=909 bgcolor=#d6d6d6
| 522909 ||  || — || September 22, 2011 || Kitt Peak || Spacewatch ||  || align=right | 2.5 km || 
|-id=910 bgcolor=#d6d6d6
| 522910 ||  || — || March 28, 2015 || Haleakala || Pan-STARRS ||  || align=right | 2.5 km || 
|-id=911 bgcolor=#E9E9E9
| 522911 ||  || — || January 26, 2014 || Catalina || CSS ||  || align=right data-sort-value="0.99" | 990 m || 
|-id=912 bgcolor=#d6d6d6
| 522912 ||  || — || November 20, 2006 || Kitt Peak || Spacewatch ||  || align=right | 2.4 km || 
|-id=913 bgcolor=#d6d6d6
| 522913 ||  || — || May 21, 2015 || Haleakala || Pan-STARRS ||  || align=right | 2.2 km || 
|-id=914 bgcolor=#d6d6d6
| 522914 ||  || — || February 24, 2014 || Haleakala || Pan-STARRS ||  || align=right | 2.7 km || 
|-id=915 bgcolor=#fefefe
| 522915 ||  || — || October 26, 2013 || Mount Lemmon || Mount Lemmon Survey ||  || align=right data-sort-value="0.62" | 620 m || 
|-id=916 bgcolor=#d6d6d6
| 522916 ||  || — || August 2, 2016 || Haleakala || Pan-STARRS ||  || align=right | 2.6 km || 
|-id=917 bgcolor=#d6d6d6
| 522917 ||  || — || September 24, 2011 || Haleakala || Pan-STARRS ||  || align=right | 2.5 km || 
|-id=918 bgcolor=#d6d6d6
| 522918 ||  || — || September 30, 2011 || Kitt Peak || Spacewatch ||  || align=right | 3.0 km || 
|-id=919 bgcolor=#fefefe
| 522919 ||  || — || March 6, 2008 || Mount Lemmon || Mount Lemmon Survey ||  || align=right data-sort-value="0.86" | 860 m || 
|-id=920 bgcolor=#E9E9E9
| 522920 ||  || — || October 17, 2012 || Haleakala || Pan-STARRS ||  || align=right | 1.7 km || 
|-id=921 bgcolor=#fefefe
| 522921 ||  || — || September 28, 2009 || Kitt Peak || Spacewatch ||  || align=right data-sort-value="0.81" | 810 m || 
|-id=922 bgcolor=#d6d6d6
| 522922 ||  || — || April 19, 2009 || Mount Lemmon || Mount Lemmon Survey ||  || align=right | 2.4 km || 
|-id=923 bgcolor=#d6d6d6
| 522923 ||  || — || October 22, 2011 || Mount Lemmon || Mount Lemmon Survey ||  || align=right | 2.4 km || 
|-id=924 bgcolor=#d6d6d6
| 522924 ||  || — || October 25, 2011 || Haleakala || Pan-STARRS || 7:4 || align=right | 3.5 km || 
|-id=925 bgcolor=#d6d6d6
| 522925 ||  || — || September 17, 2006 || Kitt Peak || Spacewatch ||  || align=right | 2.6 km || 
|-id=926 bgcolor=#d6d6d6
| 522926 ||  || — || November 3, 2011 || Mount Lemmon || Mount Lemmon Survey ||  || align=right | 2.3 km || 
|-id=927 bgcolor=#E9E9E9
| 522927 ||  || — || October 14, 2012 || Kitt Peak || Spacewatch ||  || align=right | 1.2 km || 
|-id=928 bgcolor=#E9E9E9
| 522928 ||  || — || September 22, 2012 || Kitt Peak || Spacewatch ||  || align=right data-sort-value="0.81" | 810 m || 
|-id=929 bgcolor=#E9E9E9
| 522929 ||  || — || October 22, 2012 || Haleakala || Pan-STARRS ||  || align=right | 1.5 km || 
|-id=930 bgcolor=#E9E9E9
| 522930 ||  || — || February 26, 2014 || Haleakala || Pan-STARRS ||  || align=right data-sort-value="0.89" | 890 m || 
|-id=931 bgcolor=#E9E9E9
| 522931 ||  || — || May 19, 2015 || Haleakala || Pan-STARRS ||  || align=right | 1.8 km || 
|-id=932 bgcolor=#fefefe
| 522932 ||  || — || March 5, 2011 || Kitt Peak || Spacewatch ||  || align=right data-sort-value="0.70" | 700 m || 
|-id=933 bgcolor=#d6d6d6
| 522933 ||  || — || August 26, 2005 || Campo Imperatore || CINEOS ||  || align=right | 3.1 km || 
|-id=934 bgcolor=#fefefe
| 522934 ||  || — || August 13, 2012 || Haleakala || Pan-STARRS ||  || align=right data-sort-value="0.86" | 860 m || 
|-id=935 bgcolor=#d6d6d6
| 522935 ||  || — || March 17, 2004 || Kitt Peak || Spacewatch ||  || align=right | 2.3 km || 
|-id=936 bgcolor=#d6d6d6
| 522936 ||  || — || October 28, 2011 || Kitt Peak || Spacewatch ||  || align=right | 1.7 km || 
|-id=937 bgcolor=#E9E9E9
| 522937 ||  || — || November 26, 2012 || Mount Lemmon || Mount Lemmon Survey ||  || align=right | 1.9 km || 
|-id=938 bgcolor=#E9E9E9
| 522938 ||  || — || November 23, 2012 || Kitt Peak || Spacewatch ||  || align=right | 1.3 km || 
|-id=939 bgcolor=#E9E9E9
| 522939 ||  || — || February 26, 2014 || Mount Lemmon || Mount Lemmon Survey ||  || align=right | 2.2 km || 
|-id=940 bgcolor=#d6d6d6
| 522940 ||  || — || March 22, 2009 || Mount Lemmon || Mount Lemmon Survey ||  || align=right | 2.3 km || 
|-id=941 bgcolor=#E9E9E9
| 522941 ||  || — || October 21, 2012 || Mount Lemmon || Mount Lemmon Survey ||  || align=right | 1.2 km || 
|-id=942 bgcolor=#d6d6d6
| 522942 ||  || — || October 23, 2011 || Haleakala || Pan-STARRS ||  || align=right | 2.8 km || 
|-id=943 bgcolor=#E9E9E9
| 522943 ||  || — || March 19, 2010 || Mount Lemmon || Mount Lemmon Survey ||  || align=right | 1.5 km || 
|-id=944 bgcolor=#fefefe
| 522944 ||  || — || January 10, 2007 || Mount Lemmon || Mount Lemmon Survey ||  || align=right data-sort-value="0.76" | 760 m || 
|-id=945 bgcolor=#d6d6d6
| 522945 ||  || — || January 20, 2008 || Kitt Peak || Spacewatch ||  || align=right | 2.6 km || 
|-id=946 bgcolor=#E9E9E9
| 522946 ||  || — || November 14, 2012 || Kitt Peak || Spacewatch ||  || align=right | 1.3 km || 
|-id=947 bgcolor=#d6d6d6
| 522947 ||  || — || June 10, 2015 || Haleakala || Pan-STARRS ||  || align=right | 2.2 km || 
|-id=948 bgcolor=#d6d6d6
| 522948 ||  || — || March 24, 2009 || Mount Lemmon || Mount Lemmon Survey ||  || align=right | 3.2 km || 
|-id=949 bgcolor=#E9E9E9
| 522949 ||  || — || February 22, 2014 || Kitt Peak || Spacewatch ||  || align=right data-sort-value="0.98" | 980 m || 
|-id=950 bgcolor=#d6d6d6
| 522950 ||  || — || February 10, 2008 || Kitt Peak || Spacewatch ||  || align=right | 2.6 km || 
|-id=951 bgcolor=#d6d6d6
| 522951 ||  || — || March 13, 2008 || Kitt Peak || Spacewatch ||  || align=right | 2.6 km || 
|-id=952 bgcolor=#E9E9E9
| 522952 ||  || — || December 1, 2008 || Kitt Peak || Spacewatch ||  || align=right data-sort-value="0.84" | 840 m || 
|-id=953 bgcolor=#d6d6d6
| 522953 ||  || — || August 28, 2005 || Kitt Peak || Spacewatch ||  || align=right | 2.5 km || 
|-id=954 bgcolor=#d6d6d6
| 522954 ||  || — || October 24, 2011 || Kitt Peak || Spacewatch ||  || align=right | 2.6 km || 
|-id=955 bgcolor=#fefefe
| 522955 ||  || — || May 26, 2011 || Mount Lemmon || Mount Lemmon Survey ||  || align=right data-sort-value="0.74" | 740 m || 
|-id=956 bgcolor=#E9E9E9
| 522956 ||  || — || September 15, 2007 || Mount Lemmon || Mount Lemmon Survey ||  || align=right | 1.9 km || 
|-id=957 bgcolor=#E9E9E9
| 522957 ||  || — || September 25, 2012 || Mount Lemmon || Mount Lemmon Survey ||  || align=right data-sort-value="0.96" | 960 m || 
|-id=958 bgcolor=#d6d6d6
| 522958 ||  || — || September 19, 2006 || Kitt Peak || Spacewatch ||  || align=right | 1.8 km || 
|-id=959 bgcolor=#E9E9E9
| 522959 ||  || — || September 29, 2008 || Mount Lemmon || Mount Lemmon Survey ||  || align=right | 1.3 km || 
|-id=960 bgcolor=#E9E9E9
| 522960 ||  || — || October 17, 2012 || Haleakala || Pan-STARRS ||  || align=right | 1.0 km || 
|-id=961 bgcolor=#d6d6d6
| 522961 ||  || — || January 18, 2013 || Mount Lemmon || Mount Lemmon Survey ||  || align=right | 2.3 km || 
|-id=962 bgcolor=#E9E9E9
| 522962 ||  || — || October 26, 2012 || Haleakala || Pan-STARRS ||  || align=right | 1.0 km || 
|-id=963 bgcolor=#E9E9E9
| 522963 ||  || — || January 1, 2014 || Haleakala || Pan-STARRS ||  || align=right | 1.8 km || 
|-id=964 bgcolor=#E9E9E9
| 522964 ||  || — || January 24, 2014 || Haleakala || Pan-STARRS ||  || align=right | 1.7 km || 
|-id=965 bgcolor=#E9E9E9
| 522965 ||  || — || March 13, 2011 || Mount Lemmon || Mount Lemmon Survey ||  || align=right | 1.1 km || 
|-id=966 bgcolor=#E9E9E9
| 522966 ||  || — || November 6, 2008 || Mount Lemmon || Mount Lemmon Survey ||  || align=right | 2.1 km || 
|-id=967 bgcolor=#d6d6d6
| 522967 ||  || — || January 3, 2013 || Mount Lemmon || Mount Lemmon Survey ||  || align=right | 2.6 km || 
|-id=968 bgcolor=#d6d6d6
| 522968 ||  || — || August 30, 2011 || Haleakala || Pan-STARRS ||  || align=right | 3.3 km || 
|-id=969 bgcolor=#E9E9E9
| 522969 ||  || — || September 11, 2007 || Kitt Peak || Spacewatch ||  || align=right | 1.9 km || 
|-id=970 bgcolor=#d6d6d6
| 522970 ||  || — || October 2, 2006 || Mount Lemmon || Mount Lemmon Survey ||  || align=right | 2.2 km || 
|-id=971 bgcolor=#E9E9E9
| 522971 ||  || — || September 16, 2012 || Kitt Peak || Spacewatch ||  || align=right | 2.2 km || 
|-id=972 bgcolor=#E9E9E9
| 522972 ||  || — || September 9, 2004 || Kitt Peak || Spacewatch ||  || align=right data-sort-value="0.86" | 860 m || 
|-id=973 bgcolor=#d6d6d6
| 522973 ||  || — || January 29, 2014 || Kitt Peak || Spacewatch ||  || align=right | 2.7 km || 
|-id=974 bgcolor=#d6d6d6
| 522974 ||  || — || March 17, 2015 || Haleakala || Pan-STARRS ||  || align=right | 2.0 km || 
|-id=975 bgcolor=#fefefe
| 522975 ||  || — || January 4, 2011 || Mount Lemmon || Mount Lemmon Survey ||  || align=right data-sort-value="0.78" | 780 m || 
|-id=976 bgcolor=#E9E9E9
| 522976 ||  || — || January 29, 2014 || Kitt Peak || Spacewatch ||  || align=right | 2.1 km || 
|-id=977 bgcolor=#E9E9E9
| 522977 ||  || — || October 21, 2008 || Kitt Peak || Spacewatch ||  || align=right | 1.1 km || 
|-id=978 bgcolor=#fefefe
| 522978 ||  || — || August 16, 2009 || Kitt Peak || Spacewatch ||  || align=right data-sort-value="0.90" | 900 m || 
|-id=979 bgcolor=#d6d6d6
| 522979 ||  || — || December 8, 2012 || Kitt Peak || Spacewatch ||  || align=right | 2.2 km || 
|-id=980 bgcolor=#E9E9E9
| 522980 ||  || — || November 19, 2008 || Mount Lemmon || Mount Lemmon Survey ||  || align=right | 1.1 km || 
|-id=981 bgcolor=#d6d6d6
| 522981 ||  || — || October 23, 2012 || Mount Lemmon || Mount Lemmon Survey ||  || align=right | 2.4 km || 
|-id=982 bgcolor=#E9E9E9
| 522982 ||  || — || October 14, 2012 || Catalina || CSS ||  || align=right | 2.0 km || 
|-id=983 bgcolor=#E9E9E9
| 522983 ||  || — || December 28, 2013 || Mount Lemmon || Mount Lemmon Survey ||  || align=right | 1.1 km || 
|-id=984 bgcolor=#d6d6d6
| 522984 ||  || — || November 17, 2007 || Kitt Peak || Spacewatch ||  || align=right | 2.3 km || 
|-id=985 bgcolor=#d6d6d6
| 522985 ||  || — || January 16, 2013 || Haleakala || Pan-STARRS ||  || align=right | 2.7 km || 
|-id=986 bgcolor=#E9E9E9
| 522986 ||  || — || March 25, 2015 || Haleakala || Pan-STARRS ||  || align=right | 1.2 km || 
|-id=987 bgcolor=#E9E9E9
| 522987 ||  || — || August 7, 2016 || Haleakala || Pan-STARRS ||  || align=right data-sort-value="0.82" | 820 m || 
|-id=988 bgcolor=#d6d6d6
| 522988 ||  || — || April 4, 2014 || Mount Lemmon || Mount Lemmon Survey ||  || align=right | 2.5 km || 
|-id=989 bgcolor=#d6d6d6
| 522989 ||  || — || January 6, 2013 || Kitt Peak || Spacewatch ||  || align=right | 2.5 km || 
|-id=990 bgcolor=#E9E9E9
| 522990 ||  || — || May 2, 2010 || WISE || WISE ||  || align=right | 2.2 km || 
|-id=991 bgcolor=#d6d6d6
| 522991 ||  || — || September 28, 2011 || Kitt Peak || Spacewatch ||  || align=right | 2.4 km || 
|-id=992 bgcolor=#E9E9E9
| 522992 ||  || — || January 26, 2006 || Catalina || CSS ||  || align=right | 1.7 km || 
|-id=993 bgcolor=#d6d6d6
| 522993 ||  || — || November 20, 2006 || Kitt Peak || Spacewatch ||  || align=right | 2.6 km || 
|-id=994 bgcolor=#E9E9E9
| 522994 ||  || — || August 8, 2016 || Haleakala || Pan-STARRS ||  || align=right | 1.5 km || 
|-id=995 bgcolor=#d6d6d6
| 522995 ||  || — || March 5, 2008 || Mount Lemmon || Mount Lemmon Survey ||  || align=right | 2.5 km || 
|-id=996 bgcolor=#d6d6d6
| 522996 ||  || — || April 19, 2009 || Mount Lemmon || Mount Lemmon Survey ||  || align=right | 2.6 km || 
|-id=997 bgcolor=#d6d6d6
| 522997 ||  || — || May 21, 2015 || Haleakala || Pan-STARRS ||  || align=right | 2.1 km || 
|-id=998 bgcolor=#d6d6d6
| 522998 ||  || — || September 4, 2011 || Haleakala || Pan-STARRS ||  || align=right | 2.9 km || 
|-id=999 bgcolor=#d6d6d6
| 522999 ||  || — || September 28, 2011 || Mount Lemmon || Mount Lemmon Survey ||  || align=right | 1.9 km || 
|-id=000 bgcolor=#E9E9E9
| 523000 ||  || — || October 25, 2012 || Mount Lemmon || Mount Lemmon Survey ||  || align=right | 1.2 km || 
|}

References

External links 
 Discovery Circumstances: Numbered Minor Planets (520001)–(525000) (IAU Minor Planet Center)

0522